= List of Bathurst 1000 vehicles =

The following is a list of all the cars that have raced in the combined history of the Bathurst 1000 motor race, from the 1960 Armstrong 500 up until today and including both races that were held in 1997 and 1998. This is a list of cars as they were sold and marketed to the general public (i.e. the base models) and not the homologation racing editions such as the Ford Sierra RS500 and the various Group C and Group A Holden Commodores.

== Alfa Romeo ==
Alfa Romeo 33 - 1987
Alfa Romeo 75 - 1987
Alfa Romeo 155 - 1997, 1998
Alfa Romeo 1600 GTV - 1967
Alfa Romeo 1750 Berlina - 1969
Alfa Romeo 1750 GTV - 1968, 1969, 1972
Alfa Romeo 2000 GTV - 1973, 1974, 1975, 1976, 1977, 1978, 1979
Alfa Romeo Alfasud - 1980
Alfa Romeo Alfetta - 1974, 1976, 1977, 1978, 1979, 1980, 1981, 1982, 1983, 1984, 1985, 1986
Alfa Romeo Giulia Super - 1967, 1971
Alfa Romeo GT Junior - 1974, 1975

== Audi ==
Audi 5+5 - 1982, 1983, 1984, 1985
Audi A4 - 1997, 1998
Audi Super 90 - 1967

== Austin ==
Austin Freeway - 1962
Austin Lancer - 1960

== BMW ==
BMW 2002 Tii - 1975, 1976, 1977
BMW 2800 - 1970
BMW 3.0 S - 1974, 1976, 1977, 1978, 1979
BMW 318i - 1994, 1997, 1998, 1999
BMW 320i - 1997, 1998, 1999
BMW 323i - 1986, 1990
BMW 325i - 1998
BMW 530i - 1978
BMW 635CSi - 1981, 1982, 1983, 1984, 1985, 1986, 1987, 1989, 1990, 1991, 1992
BMW M3 - 1987, 1988, 1989, 1990, 1991, 1992, 1993, 1994

== Chevrolet ==
Chevrolet Camaro - 1979, 1980, 1981, 1982, 1983, 1984, 2023, 2024, 2025

== Chrysler ==
Chrysler Galant - 1972
Chrysler Valiant - 1962, 1963, 1964, 1965, 1966, 1968, 1969, 1970
Chrysler Valiant Charger - 1971, 1972, 1973

== Citroën ==
Citroën DS21 - 1968
Citroën ID19 - 1962, 1964

== Datsun ==
Datsun 1000 - 1967, 1968, 1969
Datsun 1200 - 1967, 1970, 1971, 1972, 1973, 1974, 1975, 1976
Datsun 1300 - 1966, 1967
Datsun 1600 - 1968, 1969, 1970, 1971, 1972
Datsun 180B - 1973, 1974
Datsun 240K - 1974
Datsun 260Z 2+2 - 1975

== Dodge ==
Dodge Phoenix - 1967

== Fiat ==
Fiat 124 - 1967
Fiat 124S - 1968, 1971, 1972, 1976
Fiat 125 - 1968, 1969, 1970
Fiat 128 - 1970, 1973, 1976
Fiat 600 - 1960
Fiat 770 - 1963
Fiat 850 - 1965, 1966, 1967, 1972
Fiat 1500 - 1966
Fiat 2300 - 1965
Fiat Uno - 1986

== Ford ==
Ford Anglia - 1960, 1961, 1962
Ford Capri - 1969, 1974, 1975, 1976, 1977, 1978, 1979, 1980, 1981, 1982, 1983, 1984
Ford Cortina - 1963, 1964, 1965, 1966, 1967, 1968, 1969, 1970, 1971
Ford Customline - 1960, 1961
Ford Escort - 1970, 1971, 1972, 1973, 1974, 1975, 1976, 1977, 1978, 1979, 1980, 1981, 1982, 1986
Ford Falcon - 1960, 1961, 1962, 1967, 1968, 1969, 1970, 1971, 1972, 1973, 1974, 1975, 1976, 1977, 1978, 1979, 1980, 1981, 1982, 1983, 1984, 1992, 1993, 1994, 1995, 1996, 1997, 1998, 1999, 2000, 2001, 2002, 2003, 2004, 2005, 2006, 2007, 2008, 2009, 2010, 2011, 2012, 2013, 2014, 2015, 2016, 2017, 2018
Ford Mondeo - 1997, 1998, 1999
Ford Mustang - 1984, 1985, 1986, 2019, 2020, 2021, 2022, 2023, 2024, 2025
Ford Sierra - 1986, 1987, 1988, 1989, 1990, 1991, 1992, 1993, 1994
Ford Telstar - 1998
Ford Zephyr - 1962, 1963, 1964

== Hillman ==
Hillman Arrow - 1967, 1968
Hillman Gazelle - 1968, 1969
Hillman Imp - 1964, 1967, 1968, 1969
Hillman Minx - 1960, 1962, 1966

== Holden ==
Holden Commodore - 1980, 1981, 1982, 1983, 1984, 1985, 1986, 1987, 1988, 1989, 1990, 1991, 1992, 1993, 1994, 1995, 1996, 1997, 1998, 1999, 2000, 2001, 2002, 2003, 2004, 2005, 2006, 2007, 2008, 2009, 2010, 2011, 2012, 2013, 2014, 2015, 2016, 2017, 2018, 2019, 2020, 2021, 2022
Holden EJ - 1962
Holden EK - 1961
Holden FB - 1963
Holden Gemini - 1977, 1978, 1979, 1980, 1981, 1982, 1983
Holden HK Kingswood - 1968
Holden Monaro - 1968, 1969, 1970, 1973, 1974
Holden Premier - 1964
Holden EH S4 - 1963, 1964
Holden Torana - 1967, 1970, 1971, 1972, 1973, 1974, 1975, 1976, 1977, 1978, 1979
Holden Vectra - 1998
Holden HD X2 - 1965, 1966, 1967

== Honda ==
Honda 1300 - 1971
Honda Accord - 1997, 1998
Honda Civic - 1973, 1974, 1975, 1976, 1998
Honda Integra - 1998

== Humber ==
Humber Super Snipe - 1960, 1963
Humber Vogue - 1964, 1965

== Hyundai ==
Hyundai Lantra - 1994, 1997, 1998, 1999

== Isuzu ==
Isuzu Bellett - 1965, 1966
Isuzu Gemini - 1979, 1980, 1981, 1982, 1983

== Jaguar ==
Jaguar XJS - 1980, 1981, 1982, 1984, 1985, 1986

== Leyland ==
Leyland Marina - 1974

== Lloyd ==
Lloyd Alexander - 1960

== Maserati ==
Maserati Biturbo - 1987

== Mazda ==
Mazda 1300 - 1970, 1971, 1972, 1974, 1975, 1976
Mazda 1600 - 1971
Mazda 626 - 1998
Mazda R100 - 1969
Mazda RX-2 - 1971, 1972, 1973
Mazda RX-3 - 1973, 1974, 1975, 1976, 1977, 1978, 1979
Mazda RX-7 - 1979, 1980, 1981, 1982, 1983, 1984, 1985

== Mercedes-Benz ==
Mercedes-Benz 190E - 1986, 1987, 1988, 1990, 1994
Mercedes-Benz 220SE - 1960, 1961
Mercedes-Benz 280E - 1975
Mercedes-Benz E63 AMG - 2013, 2014, 2015

== Mitsubishi ==
Mitsubishi Colt - 1981
Mitsubishi Lancer - 1980, 1981, 1999
Mitsubishi Starion - 1984, 1985, 1986, 1987, 1988, 1989

== Morris ==
Morris 850 - 1961, 1962, 1963, 1964
Morris 1100S - 1967, 1968
Morris 1500 - 1969
Morris Clubman GT - 1974, 1975, 1976
Morris Cooper - 1963, 1964, 1965, 1966, 1967
Morris Cooper S - 1965, 1966, 1967, 1968, 1969, 1970, 1971, 1973, 1974, 1975
Morris Major Elite - 1962, 1963
Morris Major - 1960
Morris Mini de Luxe - 1965, 1966
Morris Mini K - 1969

== Nissan ==
Nissan Altima - 2013, 2014, 2015, 2016, 2017, 2018, 2019
Nissan Bluebird - 1981, 1982, 1983, 1984
Nissan Gazelle - 1986, 1987, 1989
Nissan Primera - 1997, 1998, 1999
Nissan Pulsar - 1983, 1984
Nissan Sentra - 1998
Nissan Skyline - 1986, 1987, 1988, 1989, 1990, 1991, 1992
Nissan Skyline GT-R - 1990, 1991, 1992

== NSU ==
NSU Prinz - 1960, 1964

== Peugeot ==
Peugeot 403 - 1960, 1961
Peugeot 404 - 1963
Peugeot 405 - 1994, 1997, 1998
Peugeot 406 - 1997, 1998, 1999

== Porsche ==
Porsche 930 - 1999

== Prince ==
Prince 1500 - 1966, 1967

== Renault ==
Renault 10 - 1969
Renault 16 - 1969
Renault 750 - 1960
Renault Dauphine - 1960, 1961, 1962, 1963
Renault Laguna - 1997
Renault R8 - 1963, 1964, 1965, 1966, 1967, 1973

== Rover ==
Rover Vitesse - 1984, 1985, 1986

== Simca ==
Simca Aronde - 1960, 1961, 1962, 1963, 1964

== Singer ==
Singer Gazelle - 1960

== Standard ==
Standard Vanguard - 1960

== Studebaker ==
Studebaker Lark - 1961, 1962, 1963, 1964, 1965, 1966, 1967, 1968

== Subaru ==
Subaru 1300 - 1973

== Suzuki ==
Suzuki Baleno - 1998

== Toyota ==
Toyota Camry - 1997, 1998, 1999
Toyota Carina - 1994, 1998, 1999
Toyota Celica - 1977, 1978, 1979, 1980, 1981, 1982
Toyota Corolla - 1967, 1968, 1969, 1970, 1971, 1975, 1976, 1979, 1980, 1984, 1985, 1986, 1987, 1988, 1989, 1990, 1991, 1992, 1993, 1994, 1998
Toyota Corona - 1965, 1966, 1967, 1969, 1998
Toyota Crown - 1966
Toyota Supra - 1984, 1985, 1989, 1990, 1991, 1992

== Triumph ==
Triumph 2000 - 1964, 1965, 1966, 1967
Triumph 2.5 PI - 1970
Triumph Dolomite Sprint - 1975, 1976, 1977, 1978, 1979, 1980, 1981
Triumph Herald - 1960, 1961, 1962, 1963

== Vauxhall ==
Vauxhall Cavalier - 1998
Vauxhall Cresta - 1960
Vauxhall Velox - 1961, 1962, 1964
Vauxhall Vectra - 1997, 1998, 1999
Vauxhall Viva - 1964, 1965, 1966

== Volkswagen ==
Volkswagen 1600 - 1969
Volkswagen Golf - 1976, 1977, 1978, 1979, 1980
Volkswagen Passat - 1974, 1975, 1976
Volkswagen Beetle - 1960, 1961, 1962, 1963, 1964

== Volvo ==
Volvo 122S - 1965, 1966, 1967
Volvo 240T - 1985, 1986
Volvo 242GT - 1979
Volvo 850 - 1997
Volvo S40 - 1998, 1999
Volvo S60 - 2014, 2015, 2016
