= List of female Bathurst 1000 drivers =

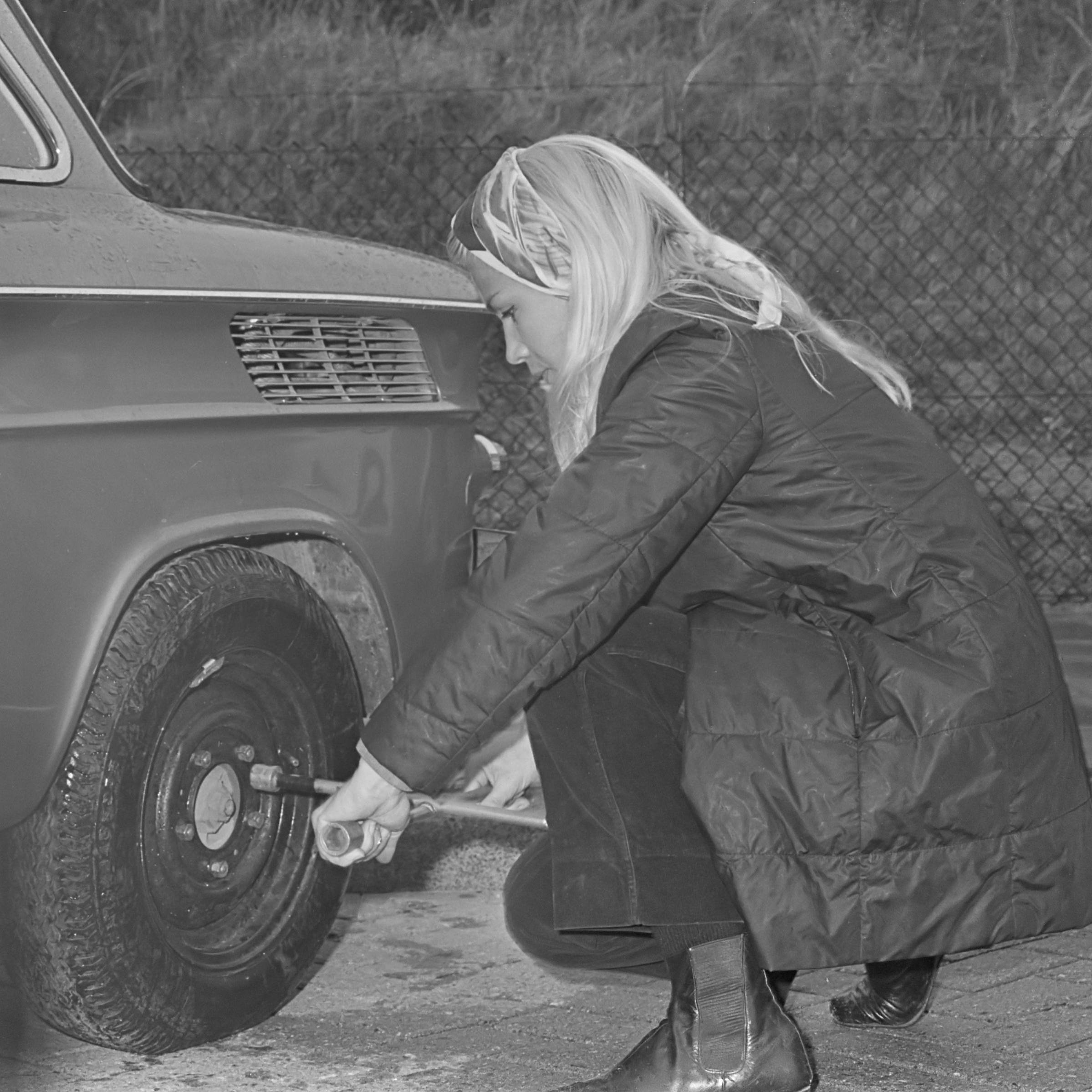
Marie-Claude Beaumont (pictured in 1968) holds the best result for a female driver at the Bathurst 1000, finishing 6th in 1975.

As of 2025, thirty-five female drivers have attempted the Bathurst 1000 – an annual endurance race for touring cars considered Australia's most prestigious – since its inception in 1960. Initially held at the Phillip Island Grand Prix Circuit over 500 miles, the race moved to Mount Panorama/Wahluu in 1963 and was expanded to 1000 kilometres in 1973.

== History ==
The first female competitors in "the Great Race" were Anne Bennett, Diane Leighton and Pam Murison, who shared a Simca Aronde to 3rd in class in the 1962 Armstrong 500 at Phillip Island. Lorraine Hill was the first to compete in the race after its shift to Bathurst, finishing 16th in class in 1963. Following a four-year gap with no female competitors, Jane Richardson and Midge Whiteman finished 4th in class in 1967 before Whiteman paired up with Christine Cole to finish 5th in class the following year. In 1969, a record six female drivers participated in the race, led by Diane Dickson and her husband Max driving a Ford Cortina to 31st outright. In 1970, Cole and Sandra Bennett finished 13th outright in a Holden Torana LC GTR XU-1, the best result for a female pairing to that point, before Pat Peck became the only woman to attempt the race solo in 1972.

The 1000km era began poorly for the female contingent, with both all-female teams (Sue Ransom/Christine Cole and Pat Peck/Darrylyn Huitt) failing to make it past 5 laps in 1973. Fortunes changed for 1975, as all three female drivers finished and Frenchwoman Marie-Claude Beaumont claimed the best outright finish for a female driver (as of 2025) with 6th in an Alfa Romeo 2000 GTV, before all three women entered in 1976 failed to finish. In 1977, Janet Guthrie – who had become the first woman to qualify for the Indianapolis 500 a few months earlier – joined Johnny Rutherford in an all-American entry, however Rutherford crashed into an earth bank after only 13 laps. Ransom and Alexandra Surplice made sporadic appearances towards the end of the Group C touring car era in lower-class cars, however Christine Gibson (née Cole) equalled Beaumont's 6th-place in the crash-shortened 1981 race. For the 1987 edition, held as part of the World Touring Car Championship under Group A regulations, Annette Meeuvissen and Mercedes Stermitz shared a BMW but retired from the race with gearbox problems. New Zealander Heather Spurle was the only other female Group A competitor, finishing 26th in 1990 with Bob Jones, before Tania Gulson and Melinda Price contested the lower classes in 1993 and 1994 respectively.

Women competed on both sides of the Super Touring/V8 split in the late-1990s – Jenni Thompson contested both Super Touring races, and was joined by Paula Elstrek and Heidi O'Neill in 1998, whilst Perkins Engineering formed the "Castrol Cougars" for Price and Kerryn Brewer to compete in the V8 editions; the "Cougars" claimed the best finish for an all-female team as of 2025 with 11th in the 1998 V8 race. Nicole Pretty was also entered in the 1998 V8 race, sharing a Holden Commodore VS with her brother Nathan, but did not get to drive following alternator failure. After the Cougars were disbanded, Price competed for another two years with privateer team Clive Wiseman Racing, finishing 17th in 1999, before Leanne Ferrier failed to finish the 2001 V8 Supercar 1000 having collided with Nathan Pretty. Ferrier would not return to the Bathurst 1000 until 2009, sharing a Ford Falcon FG with David Wall and finishing 18th.

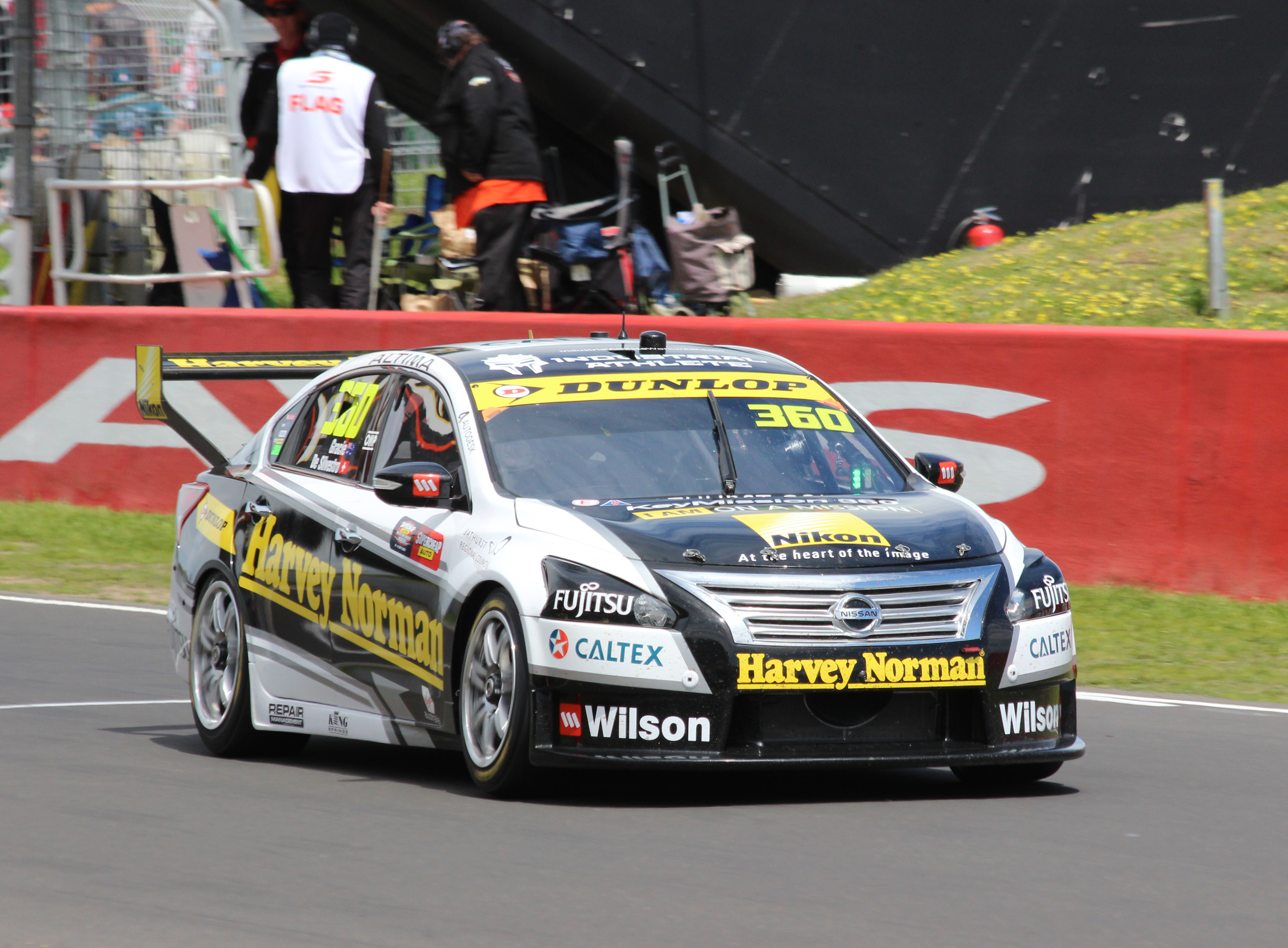
Simona de Silvestro and Renee Gracie contesting the 2016 edition in a Nissan Altima.

Six years later, Simona de Silvestro and Renee Gracie participated in a two-year "wildcard" program in 2015 and 2016. The duo finished 40 laps down in their first foray after Gracie crashed at Forrest Elbow, before improving to 14th and two laps down a year later. De Silvestro joined the category as a full-time driver for three years from 2017 with Nissan, scoring a best Great Race result of 13th in 2019 alongside Alex Rullo, before returning for a one-off start in 2023 with Dick Johnson Racing after the COVID-19 pandemic – the Swiss' 20th-place finish with Kai Allen remains the most recent participation for a female driver.

== Drivers ==
=== By name ===
#	Name	Nationality	Entries	Years active	Best result	
#	Name	Nationality	Entries	Years active	Outright	Class
=1	Anne Bennett	Australia	1	1962	19th	3rd
=1	Diane Leighton	Australia	1	1962	19th	3rd
=1	Pam Murison	Australia	1	1962	19th	3rd
4	Lorraine Hill	Australia	2	1963–1964	35th	13th
=5	Jane Richardson	Australia	1	1967	36th	4th
=5	Midge Whiteman	Australia	2	1967–1968	36th	4th
7	Christine Gibson	Australia	9	1968–1970, 1972–1973, 1976, 1981, 1983–1984	6th	5th
=8	Sandra Bennett	Australia	2	1969–1970	13th	4th
=8	Carole Corness	Australia	2	1969–1970	42nd	12th
=8	Diane Dickson	Australia	1	1969	31st	6th
=8	Lynne Keefe	Australia	2	1969–1970	36th	13th
=8	Ann Thomson	Australia	1	1969	DNF	DNF
13	Gloria Taylor	Australia	1	1970	42nd	12th
=14	Jan Holland	Australia	2	1971–1972	29th	3rd
=14	Pat Peck	Australia	3	1971–1973	29th	3rd
=16	Darrylyn Huitt	Australia	1	1973	DNF	DNF
=16	Caroline O'Shannessy	Australia	3	1973, 1975–1976	26th	6th
=16	Sue Ransom	Australia	5	1973, 1975, 1977–1978, 1980	11th	4th
19	Marie-Claude Beaumont	France	2	1975–1976	6th	1st
20	Janet Guthrie	United States	1	1977	DNF	DNF
21	Robyn Hamilton	Australia	1	1978	DNF	DNF
22	Alexandra Surplice	Australia	3	1980–1981, 1984	26th	6th
=23	Annette Meeuvissen	West Germany	1	1987	DNF	DNF
=23	Mercedes Stermitz	Austria	1	1987	DNF	DNF
25	Heather Spurle	New Zealand	1	1990	26th	21st
26	Tania Gulson	Australia	1	1993	DNQ (Note: Whilst the car Tania Gulson was entered in did qualify for the race, Gulson herself was deemed too slow to participate.)	DNQ
27	Melinda Price	Australia	5	1994, 1997–2000	11th	DNF (Note: Melinda Price only participated in one Bathurst 1000 with separate performance classes, the 1994 Tooheys 1000.)
28	Jenni Thompson	Australia	2	1997–1998	DNF	DNF
29	Kerryn Brewer	Australia	2	1997–1998	11th	—N/a
=30	Paula Elstrek	Australia	1	1998	DNF	DNF
=30	Heidi O'Neill	Australia	1	1998	DNF	DNF
32	Nicole Pretty	Australia	1	1998	DNF	—N/a
33	Leanne Ferrier	Australia	2	2001, 2009	18th	—N/a
=34	Simona de Silvestro	Switzerland	6	2015–2019, 2023	13th	—N/a
=34	Renee Gracie	Australia	2	2015–2016	14th	—N/a

=== By country ===
Country	First	Drivers	Best result	
Country	First	Drivers	Outright	Class
Australia	1962	29	6th	3rd
Austria	1987	1	DNF	DNF
France	1975	1	6th	1st
New Zealand	1990	1	26th	21st
Switzerland	2015	1	13th	—N/a
United States	1977	1	DNF	DNF
West Germany	1987	1	DNF	DNF

== All-female teams ==
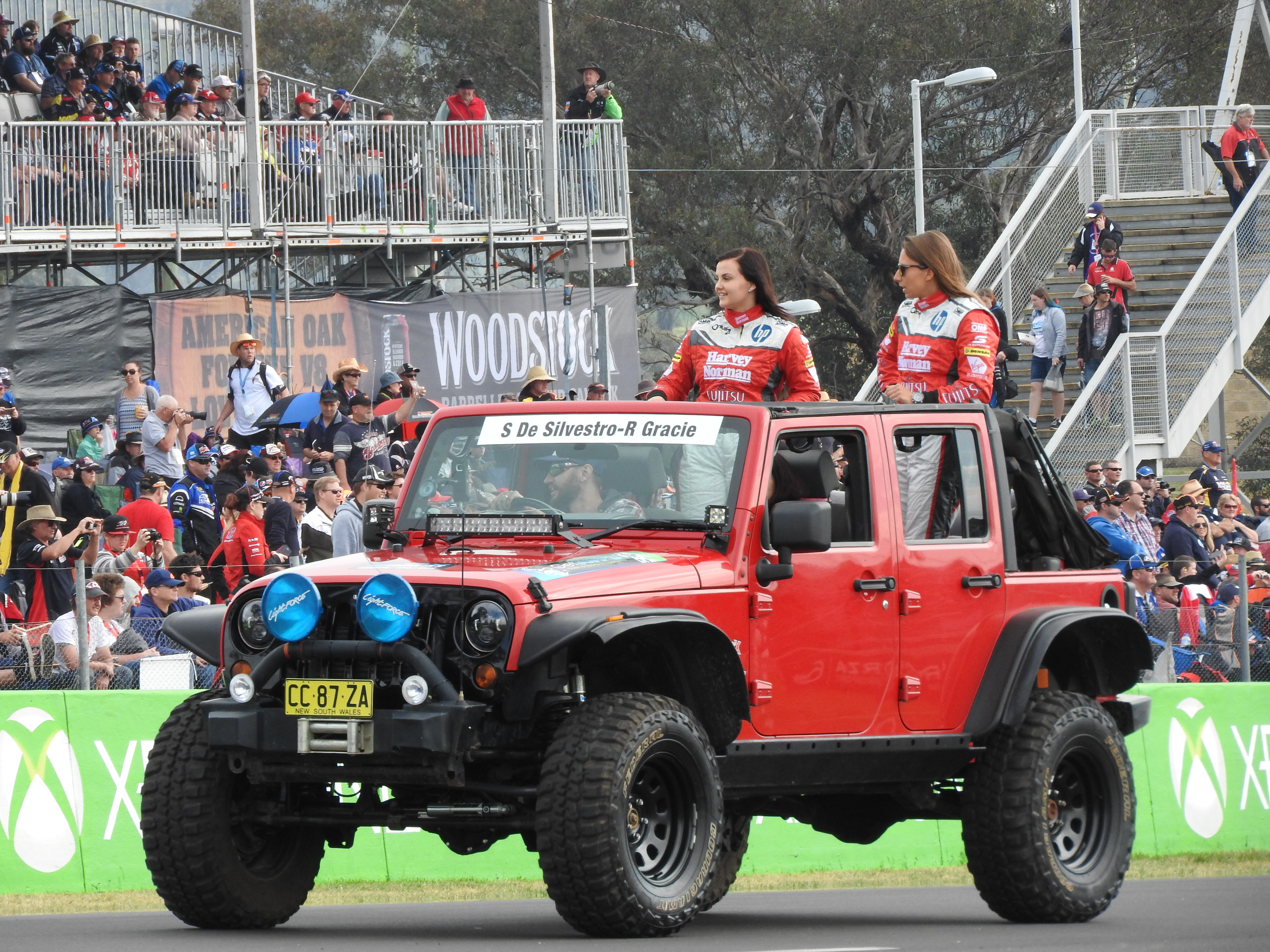
De Silvestro (right) and Gracie participating in the drivers' parade for the 2015 Bathurst 1000.

Year	Drivers	Entry	Car	Class	Result	
Year	Drivers	Entry	Car	Class	Outright	Class
1962	(Australia) Anne Bennett (Australia) Diane Leighton (Australia) Pam Murison	Eiffel Tower Group Pty. Ltd.	Simca Aronde	C	19th	3rd
1967	(Australia) Jane Richardson (Australia) Midge Whiteman	Everybody's Magazine	Morris 1100S	B	36th	4th
1968	(Australia) Christine Cole (Australia) Midge Whiteman	P & R Williams	Morris Mini DeLuxe	A	41st	5th
1969	(Australia) Carole Corness (Australia) Ann Thomson	Grand Prix Auto Services	Morris Cooper S	C	DNF	DNF
1969	(Australia) Christine Cole (Australia) Lynne Keefe	Brian Foley Motors Pty. Ltd.	Fiat 125	C	DNF	DNF
1970	(Australia) Sandra Bennett (Australia) Christine Cole	Holden Dealer Team	Holden Torana LC GTR XU-1	C	13th	8th
1970	(Australia) Carole Corness (Australia) Gloria Taylor	Woman's Day	Ford Escort Mk.1 1300	A	42nd	12th
1971	(Australia) Jan Holland (Australia) Pat Peck	D&P Traders Pty. Ltd.	Holden Torana LC GTR XU-1	C	29th	3rd
1972	(Australia) Christine Cole (Australia) Jan Holland	Pacific Film Laboratories Pty. Ltd.	Holden Torana LJ 2850	B	DNF	DNF
1972	(Australia) Pat Peck	D&P Traders Pty. Ltd.	Holden Torana LJ GTR XU-1	C	DNF	DNF
1973	(Australia) Christine Cole (Australia) Sue Ransom	Grace Bros. Racing Team	Alfa Romeo 2000 GTV	B	DNF	DNF
1973	(Australia) Darrylyn Huitt (Australia) Pat Peck	D&P Traders Pty. Ltd.	Holden Torana LJ GTR XU-1	D	DNF	DNF
1976	(France) Marie-Claude Charmasson (Australia) Christine Gibson	Brian Foley Pty. Ltd.	Alfa Romeo Alfetta GTAm	1301-2000cc	DNF	DNF
1987	(West Germany) Annette Meeuvissen (Austria) Mercedes Stermitz	BMW Motorsport (Note: Roland Ratzenberger was cross-entered into the Meeuvissen/Stermitz car, but did not drive it.)	BMW M3 (E30)	2	DNF	DNF
1997 (V8)	(Australia) Kerryn Brewer (Australia) Melinda Price	Castrol Cougars	Holden Commodore VS	—N/a	12th	—N/a
1998 (V8)	(Australia) Kerryn Brewer (Australia) Melinda Price	Castrol Cougars	Holden Commodore VS	—N/a	11th	—N/a
2015	(Switzerland) Simona de Silvestro (Australia) Renee Gracie	Harvey Norman Supergirls	Ford Falcon FG X	—N/a	21st	—N/a
2016	(Switzerland) Simona de Silvestro (Australia) Renee Gracie	Harvey Norman Supergirls	Nissan Altima L33	—N/a	14th	—N/a

== See also ==
- List of female 24 Hours of Le Mans drivers
- List of female Formula One drivers
- List of female Indianapolis 500 drivers
- List of female NASCAR drivers
- List of female racing drivers
