= 1966 Gallaher 500 =

Motor race in Australia

Seasons
- ← 1965 1967 →

Layout of the Mount Panorama Circuit (1938-1986)

The 1966 Gallaher 500 was an endurance motor race for production cars, held on 2 October 1966 at the Mount Panorama Circuit just outside Bathurst, New South Wales in Australia. It was the seventh running of the Bathurst 500 race and the first time that the event had been staged under the Gallaher 500 name. 250 examples of a particular model had to be registered for a vehicle to be eligible for the race, up from the 100 examples required in previous years.

The race was dominated by the Morris Mini Cooper S. It was won by the BMC-entered Finnish rally star Rauno Aaltonen, who became the first non-Australian to win the main event at Bathurst, and Mini expert Bob Holden. The pair finished a lap ahead of Fred Gibson and Bill Stanley, leading home a flotilla of Minis that filled the first nine outright race positions. The best non-Mini was a Chrysler Valiant, some six laps behind Aaltonen and Holden in tenth.

It was while spectating this race from Forrest's Elbow that an on leave from the army Peter Brock decided that he wanted to be a motor racing driver upon finishing his National Service. Brock would go on to make his Bathurst 500 debut in 1969 and would go on to win the race a record 9 times.

== Class structure ==
Cars competed in four classes based on the purchase price of the vehicle in Australian dollars.

=== Class A ===
The Up to $1,800 class was contested by Datsun Bluebird 1300, Fiat 850, 1.2 litre Ford Cortina, Morris Mini De Luxe and Morris 850.

=== Class B ===
The $1,801 to $2,040 class featured 1.5 litre Ford Cortina, Hillman Minx, Isuzu Bellett, Morris Cooper, Prince Skyline, Renault R8 and Toyota Corona.

=== Class C ===
The $2,041 to $2,700 class entry list was dominated by the Morris Cooper S, but also included a Fiat 1500, and a Toyota Crown.

=== Class D ===
The $2,701 to $4,000 class featured Chrysler Valiant, Holden HD X2, Studebaker Lark, Triumph 2000 and Volvo 122S.

== Results ==
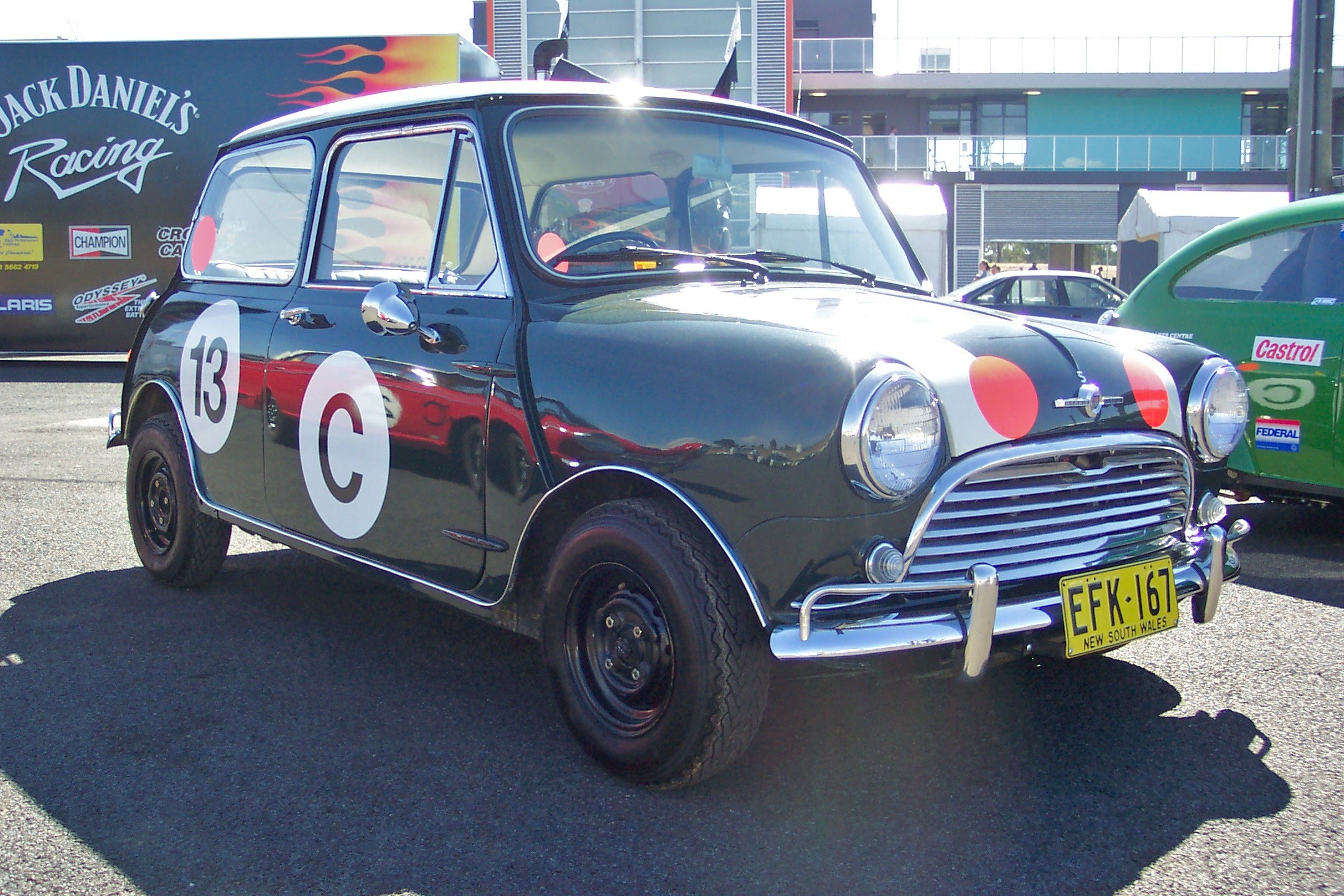
Rauno Aaltonen and Bob Holden won the race outright driving this Morris Cooper S. The car is pictured in 2006.

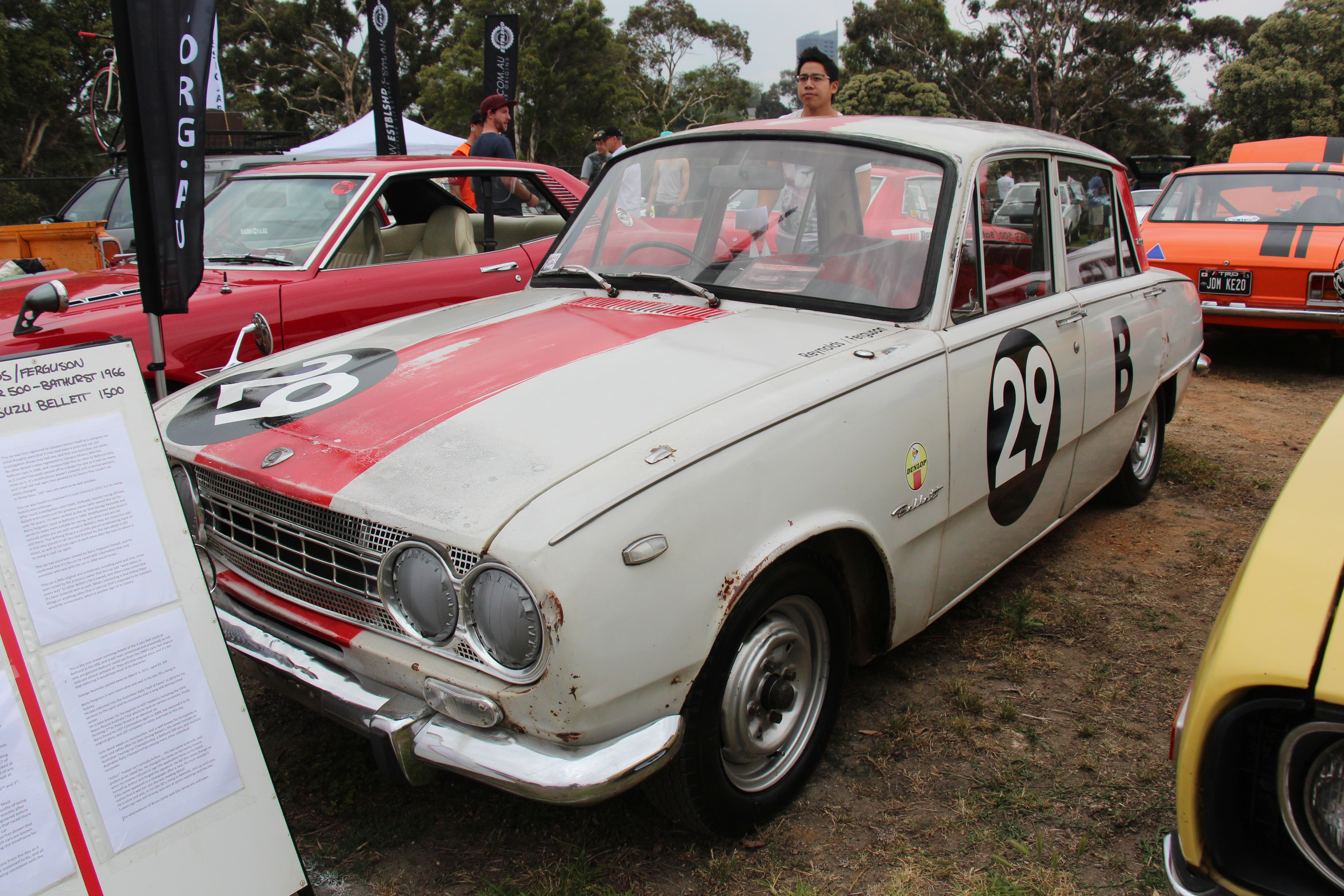
George Reynolds and Barry Ferguson placed fifth in Class B driving this Isuzu Bellett. The car is pictured in 2015

| Pos. | Class | No. | Entrant | Drivers | Car | Laps |
|---|---|---|---|---|---|---|
| 1 | C | 13 | BMC (Australia) Pty. Ltd. | (Finland) Rauno Aaltonen (Australia) Bob Holden | Morris Cooper S | 130 |
| 2 | C | 17 | Vaughan & Lane Pty. Ltd. | (Australia) Fred Gibson (Australia) Bill Stanley | Morris Cooper S | 129 |
| 3 | C | 22 | Regal Motors Pty. Ltd. | (Australia) Bruce McPhee (Australia) Barry Mulholland | Morris Cooper S | 129 |
| 4 | C | 27 | Marque Motors | (Australia) Arthur Davis (Australia) Paul Mander | Morris Cooper S | 128 |
| 5 | C | 10 | Baulkham Hills Service Station | (Australia) Peter Brown (Australia) Bob Cook | Morris Cooper S | 128 |
| 6 | C | 9 | L. Gordon Dent Pty. Ltd. | (Australia) Harry Firth (Australia) Ern Abbott | Morris Cooper S | 128 |
| 7 | C | 24 | W. Jamieson | (Australia) John Leffler (Australia) Bill Jamieson | Morris Cooper S | 127 |
| 8 | C | 23 | BMC (Australia) Pty. Ltd. | (Australia) John French (Australia) Steve Harvey | Morris Cooper S | 127 |
| 9 | C | 16 | B. Arentz | (Australia) Barry Arentz (Australia) Barry Seton | Morris Cooper S | 125 |
| 10 | D | 5 | Eiffel Tower Motors | (Australia) Jack Nougher (Australia) David O'Keefe | Chrysler VC Valiant V8 Automatic | 124 |
| 11 | D | 6 | Advanx (Gosford) Motor Service Pty. Ltd. | (Australia) Alton Boddenberg (Australia) Digby Cooke | Chrysler VC Valiant V8 Automatic | 122 |
| 12 | B | 41 | Gordon Stewart's Sports Car Centre | (Australia) Don Holland (Australia) Peter Cray | Morris Cooper | 120 |
| 13 | D | 3 | Australian Motor Industries Ltd. | (Australia) Max Stewart (Australia) Bob Young | Triumph 2000 | 120 |
| 14 | C | 20 | R. C. Kearns | (Australia) Ron Kearns (Australia) Barry Quayle | Fiat 1500 | 120 |
| 15 | D | 8 | British & Continental Cars | (Australia) Kevin Bartlett (Australia) John Harvey | Volvo 122S | 119 |
| 16 | C | 14 | Australian Motor Industries Ltd. | (Australia) Bill Buckle (Australia) Allan Mottram | Toyota Crown | 119 |
| 17 | B | 33 | Vern Potts | (Australia) Doug Chivas (Australia) Doug Chivas, Jr. | Morris Cooper | 119 |
| 18 | B | 42 | Brian Foley Motors Pty. Ltd. | (Australia) Laurie Stewart (Australia) Ray Morris | Morris Cooper | 119 |
| 19 | D | 7 | M. Savva | (Australia) Mike Savva (Australia) Herb Taylor | Holden HD X2 | 118 |
| 20 | B | 37 | Australian Motor Industries | (Australia) Brian Reed (Australia) Des Kelly | Toyota Corona | 117 |
| 21 | B | 29 | Canopus Motors Pty. Ltd. | (Australia) George Reynolds (Australia) Barry Ferguson | Isuzu Bellett 1500 | 117 |
| 22 | A | 54 | Nissan Motor Company (Aust.) Pty. Ltd. | (Japan) Moto Kitano (Japan) Kunimitsu Takahashi | Datsun Bluebird 1300 | 117 |
| 23 | A | 49 | Nissan Motor Company (Aust.) Pty. Ltd. | (Australia) John Roxburgh (Australia) Doug Whiteford | Datsun Bluebird 1300 | 116 |
| 24 | A | 53 | Peakhurst Tyre Service Pty. Ltd. | (Australia) Brian Lawler (Australia) Harry Gapps | Ford Cortina Mk.I 220 | 116 |
| 25 | B | 45 | Motor Racing Components | (Australia) Lionel Ayers (Australia) Max Volkers | Hillman Minx Series 6 | 116 |
| 26 | A | 51 | Nissan Motor Company (Aust.) Pty. Ltd. | (Australia) John Colwell (Australia) Fred Sutherland | Datsun Bluebird 1300 | 116 |
| 27 | B | 32 | Australian Motor Industries | (Australia) Brian Sampson (Australia) Lew Marshall | Toyota Corona | 116 |
| 28 | A | 47 | Frank Crott Motors Pty. Ltd. | (Australia) Trevor Meehan (Australia) Ian Hindmarsh | Fiat 850 | 113 |
| 29 | A | 55 | Marque Motors | (Australia) Mike Schneider (Australia) Bruce Wright | Morris Mini De Luxe | 113 |
| 30 | B | 40 | John Rhodin Pty. Ltd. | (Australia) Arthur Treloar (Australia) Colin Bond | Isuzu Bellett 1500 | 111 |
| 31 | A | 56 | Radial Tyre Service Pty. Ltd. | (Australia) George Garth (Australia) Ray Marquet | Ford Cortina Mk.I 1200 | 110 |
| 32 | A | 50 | Ken Lindsay Motors Pty. Ltd. | (Australia) Ken Lindsay (Australia) Des West | Ford Cortina Mk.I 1200 | 110 |
| 33 | B | 34 | Peter Williamson Pty. Ltd. | (Australia) Peter Williamson (Australia) Alex Macarthur | Toyota Corona | 110 |
| 34 | A | 57 | K. D. McCallum & Coy | (Australia) John T. Smith (Australia) Dennis Gregory | Morris Mini De Luxe | 109 |
| 35 | B | 43 | Renault R8 | (Australia) Bob Edgerton (Australia) Ross Edgerton | Renault R8 | 106 |
| 36 | B | 31 | Varsity Auto Centre | (Australia) John Prisk (Australia) Mike Martin | Morris Cooper | 105 |
| 37 | B | 35 | Autobahn Motors Pty. Ltd. | (Australia) Bruce Darke (Australia) Don James | Isuzu Bellett 1500 | 104 |
| 38 | D | 2 | Needham's Motors Pty. Ltd. | (Australia) Warren Weldon (Australia) Bill Slattery | Studebaker Lark | 88 |
| 39 | A | 48 | M. Bailey | (Australia) Malcolm Bailey (Australia) John Hicks | Morris 850 | 87 |
| 40 | B | 38 | Wheelmar Distributors Pty. Ltd. | (Australia) Carl Kennedy (Australia) Doug Stewart | Prince Skyline 1500 | 82 |
| 41 | B | 30 | Denis Geary Motors Pty. Ltd. | (Australia) Gary Hodge (Australia) Denis Geary | Ford Cortina Mk.I 1500 | 74 |
| DNF | C | 21 | Vaughan & Lane Pty. Ltd. | (Australia) Frank Matich (Australia) Frank Demuth | Morris Cooper S | 126 |
| DNF | A | 46 | Bill Burns | (Australia) Bill Burns (Australia) Alex Lazich | Fiat 850 | |
| DNF | A | 58 | G. Shoesmith | (Australia) Gary Shoesmith (Australia) Tony Robards | Vauxhall Viva | 94 |
| DNF | C | 26 | M. Crampton Engineering | (Australia) Mick Crampton (Australia) Geoff Leeds | Morris Cooper S | |
| DNF | C | 18 | C. G. Smith | (Australia) Charlie Smith (Australia) Ron Haylen | Morris Cooper S | 64 |
| NC | C | 19 | Radford Carriers | (Australia) Rick Radford (Australia) David Bye | Morris Cooper S | 54 |
| DNF | D | 4 | British & Continental Cars | (Australia) Gerry Lister (Australia) Graham Porter | Volvo 122S | 52 |
| DNF | C | 15 | W. Yates Pty. Ltd. | (Australia) Ken Stacey (Australia) Mal Henderson | Morris Cooper S | |
| DNF | C | 28 | BMC (Australia) Pty. Ltd. | (United Kingdom) Paddy Hopkirk (Australia) Brian Foley | Morris Cooper S | 28 |
| DNF | C | 12 | Ron Hodgson Motors Pty. Ltd. | (Australia) Ron Hodgson (Australia) Bob Beasley | Morris Cooper S | 15 |
| DNF | C | 25 | P. Coogan | (Australia) George Forrest (Australia) Frank Hann | Morris Cooper S | 12 |
| DNF | B | 39 | Wheelmar Distributors Pty. Ltd. | (Australia) Jack Murray (Australia) Bill Ford | Prince Skyline 1500 | |
| DNS | B | 44 | M.G. Car Club (N.S.W.) | (Australia) Matt Daddo (Australia) Warren Carden | Morris Cooper | - |

== Statistics ==
- Fastest lap: #21 Frank Matich - 3m 10s (116.94 km/h) (lap record)
- Race time of first car to finish: 7:11:29.1
- Average speed: 112 km/h
- Fastest flying 1/8 mi (0.20 km): Warren Weldon. Bill Slattery, No. 2 Studebaker Lark, 119.04 mph (191.58 km/h)
