= 1962 Armstrong 500 =

Motor race in Australia

Seasons
- ← 1961 1963 →

The 1962 Armstrong 500 was an endurance race for Australian built production cars. The race was held at the Phillip Island circuit in Victoria, Australia on 21 October 1962 over 167 laps of the 3.0 mile circuit, a total of 501 miles. Cars competed in four classes based on the retail price of each model. Officially, only class placings were awarded but the No 21 Ford Falcon driven by Harry Firth and Bob Jane was recognised as "First across the line". This was the third and last Armstrong 500 to be held at Phillip Island prior to the race being moved to the Mount Panorama Circuit at Bathurst in New South Wales where it later became known as the Bathurst 1000.

== Class structure ==
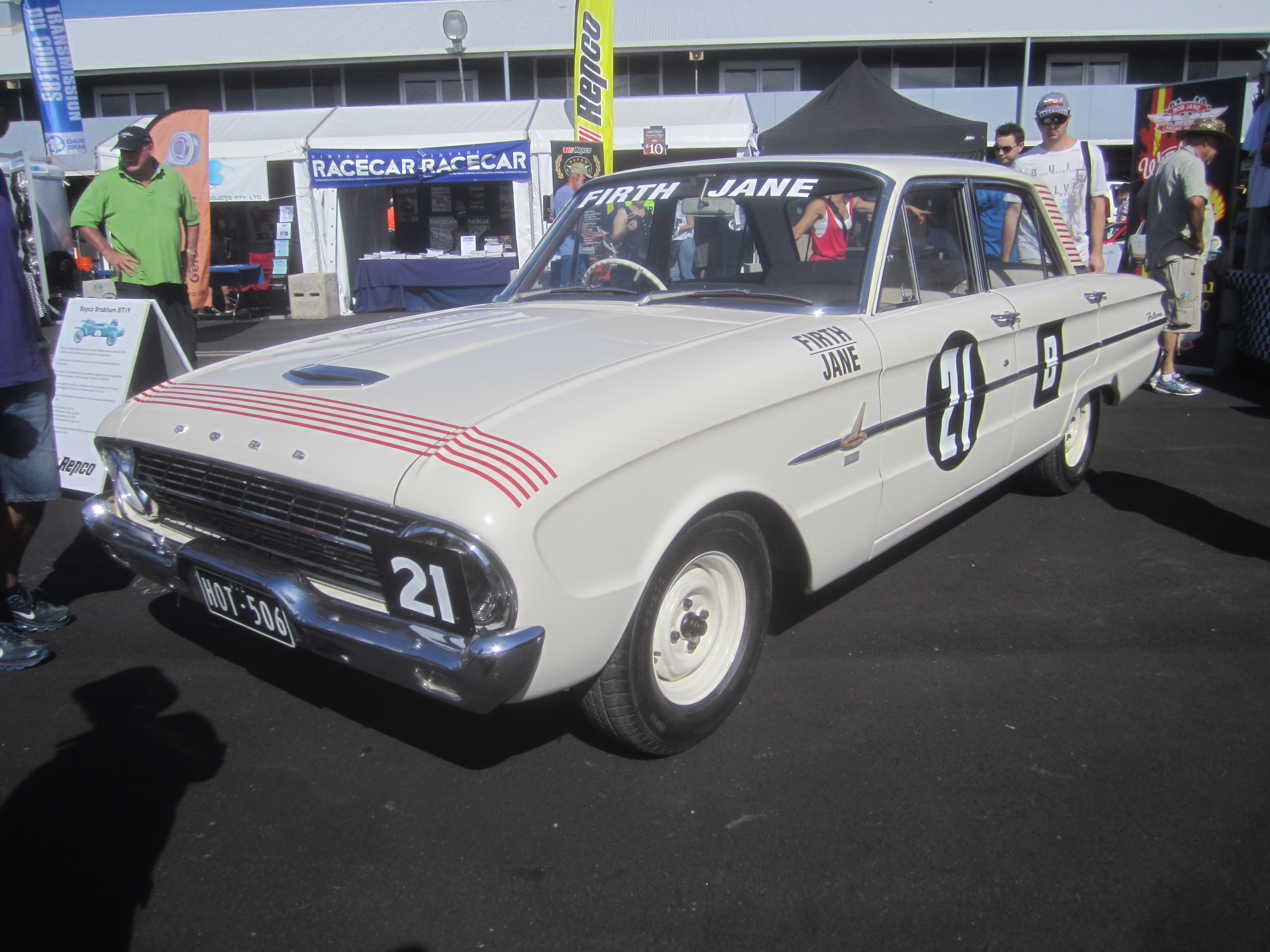
A Ford Falcon XL built up as a tribute to the car which is credited as "First across the line" in the 1962 Armstrong 500

For the 1962 race the division of classes was changed from engine capacity, used in the previous two Armstrong 500s, to the purchase price (in Australian pounds, the currency of the era) of the vehicle on the Australian market, with the intent to allow members of the public to make comparisons between cars which they could personally afford. An upper limit of £2000 was established to prevent the race from being dominated by purpose-built sports cars. These changes saw the Renault Gordinis move up from Class D to Class C, while the Volkswagens dropped from C to D. Volkswagen would break through for their first class victory this year.

=== Class A ===
Class A was for cars with a purchase price of between £1251 and £2000. The class featured Chrysler Valiant, Citroën ID19, Ford Zephyr, Studebaker Lark and Vauxhall Velox.

=== Class B ===
Class B was for cars with a purchase price of between £1051 and £1250. The class was dominated by the new Ford Falcon XL but also feature Austin Freeway and Holden EJ.

=== Class C ===
Class C was for cars with a purchase price of between £901 and £1050. The class featured Hillman Minx, Morris Major, Renault Gordini and Simca Aronde.

=== Class D ===
Class D was for cars with a purchase price of less than £900. The class featured Ford Anglia, Morris 850, Triumph Herald and Volkswagen.

== Race ==
The race was dominated by the XL series Ford Falcon, three of which were amongst the first four finishers, led by the factory-supported car of defending winners Harry Firth and Bob Jane. On the same lap as Firth and Jane was the Class A winning Studebaker of Fred Sutherland and Bill Graetz, who won the class by four laps, defeating the factory-supported Ford Zephyr being driven by Geoff Russell and David Anderson, denying them a third consecutive class victory. This was as close as a Studebaker would get to an outright victory in the history of the event.

In Class C a Renault Gordini won despite being moved up from Class D with Rex Emmett, John Connolly and 1975 winner Brian Sampson winning by four laps. The Renault Gordini driven by Emmett, Connolly and Sampson which covered the most laps in Class C was initially disqualified after the race along with the Morris 850 driven by Allen and Hooker which crossed the line in second place in Class D. Appeals were lodged in both cases. Later published results show the cars as first in Class C and second in Class D respectively.

Jim McKeown, an emerging star in small capacity touring cars, and George Reynolds took their Volkswagen to the Class D victory, beating the leading Mini by a lap. Reynolds too had an outright victory in store in just two years time in 1964.

== Aftermath ==
The toil placed on the cold mix bitumen surface by the race, with the largest entry the race had seen, overwhelmed the Phillip Island racetrack. Dangerous potholes formed all around the circuit, leaving a hefty repair bill, and an ominous threat to the future growth of the race. Staying at Phillip Island, as attractive as other factors presented, was plainly impossible and the search began by the promoters for a new home for the increasingly popular endurance production car race. Earlier the same year the Bathurst Six Hour Classic had been held at the Mount Panorama Circuit near Bathurst (won by a Daimler not eligible to run in the Armstrong), and that circuit immediately entered speculation.

== Results ==
Pos	No	Entrant	Drivers	Car	Laps
Class A
1	2	Canada Cycle & Motor Co.	(Australia) Fred Sutherland (Australia) Bill Graetz	Studebaker Lark	167
2	10	Ford Motor Co. of Australia	(Australia) Geoff Russell (Australia) David Anderson	Ford Zephyr Mk III	163
3	7	Continental & General Distributors Pty. Ltd.	(Australia) Norm Beechey (Australia) Greg Cusack	Citroën ID19	160
4	5	Hawthorn Auto Wreckers	(Australia) Vic Croft (Australia) Wal Gillespie	Chrysler Valiant	160
5	8	Scuderia Veloce	(Australia) Bill Buckle (Australia) Brian Foley	Citroën ID19	156
6	9	Wallace Auto Racing Stable	(Australia) Bill Wilson (Australia) Mike Ide	Citroën ID19	155
7	6	Calder Motor Raceway	(Australia) Pat Hawthorn (Australia) G Hibberd	Chrysler Valiant	153
8	3	Hospital Hill Motors Service Station	(Australia) Don Algie (Australia) Kingsley Hibbard	Studebaker Lark	127
DNF	4	Auburn Garage	(Australia) Peter White (Australia) Peter Boyd-Squires	Chrysler Valiant	118
DNF	1	S.A. Cheney Pty. Ltd.	(Australia) Frank Coad (Australia) John Roxburgh	Vauxhall Velox	64
Class B
1	21	Ford Motor Co. of Australia	(Australia) Harry Firth (Australia) Bob Jane	Ford Falcon XL	167
2	20	Ford Motor Co. of Australia	(Australia) Ken Harper (Australia) John Raeburn (Australia) Syd Fisher	Ford Falcon XL	166
3	25	Broon's Motors Pty. Ltd.	(Australia) Alan Caelli (Australia) J Edwards (Australia) John Bodinnar	Ford Falcon XL	165
4	26	L.J. Callaway	(Australia) John Callaway (Australia) Frank Porter (Australia) Jim Smith	Ford Falcon XL	161
5	22	Molybond Laboritories Pty. Ltd.	(Australia) Barry Foster (Australia) Bob Brown (Australia) David Catlin	Holden EJ	160
6	24	Hilltop Autos	(Australia) Lex Davison (Australia) John Brindley (Australia) Phil Trueman	Austin Freeway	159
7	23	C. Smith	(Australia) Charlie Smith (Australia) Brucer Maher	Austin Freeway	145
8	27	New Oakleigh Motors and New St. Kilda Motors	(Australia) Kevin Lott (Australia) Tom Roddy (Australia) Brian Devlin	Ford Falcon XL	134
Class C
1	30	Rex Emmett	(Australia) Rex Emmett (Australia) John Connolly (Australia) Brian Sampson	Renault Gordini	162
2	34	Edney's Garage	(Australia) Alan Edney (Australia) Greg Fayers	Morris Major Elite	158
3	33	Eiffel Tower Group Pty. Ltd.	(Australia) Diane Leighton (Australia) Anne Bennett (Australia) Pam Murison	Simca Aronde	157
4	37	Clemens Sporting Car Service	(Australia) Ian Wells (Australia) Don Dunoon	Hillman Minx	151
5	36	W. Nalder	(Australia) Wes Nalder (Australia) John Fish	Hillman Minx	145
DNF	31	Eiffel Tower Group Pty. Ltd.	(Australia) Jack Eiffeltower (Australia) Lionel Marsh (Australia) Vern Curtin	Simca Aronde	121
DNF	32	Eiffel Tower Group Pty. Ltd.	(Australia) Bill Roberts (Australia) J Hume (Australia) W Murison	Simca Aronde	63
DNF	35	Carburettor Centre, Belvedere Motors Pty. Ltd.	(Australia) Les Darcy (Australia) Don Castaldi	Simca Aronde	60
Class D
1	48	H.G. McLean Motors Pty. Ltd.	(Australia) George Reynolds (Australia) Jim McKeown	Volkswagen	162
2	43		(Australia) D Hooker (Australia) Terry Allen	Morris 850	161
3	41	Ace Motors Pty. Ltd.	(Australia) Geoffrey Waite (Australia) Peter Macrow (Australia) Rocky Tresise	Morris 850	160
4	50	Spencer Motors	(Australia) Tony Theiler (Australia) Bob Foreman (Australia) Reg Lunn	Volkswagen	160
5	40	Jack Hunnam	(Australia) Jack Hunnam (Australia) John Hartnett	Morris 850	160
6	42	Head Brothers	(Australia) George Huse (Australia) Clarrie Head	Morris 850	159
7	51	G.A. Gibson	(Australia) Hoot Gibson (Australia) Paul England (Australia) Jack Madden	Triumph Herald	157
8	44	S.D. Hughes	(Australia) Graham Hoinville (Australia) Kevin Burns	Ford Anglia	157
9	47	S.C. Martin	(Australia) Stan Martin (Australia) Les Park	Triumph Herald	154
10	53	Sydney Grevett	(Australia) Syd Grevett (Australia) Cliff van Praag	Morris 850	150
11	45	McLure's Restaurants Pty. Ltd.	(Australia) George Poulton (Australia) R Poulton (Australia) M Watson	Triumph Herald	150
DNF	49	E. Whiteford Motors Pty. Ltd.	(Australia) Doug Whiteford (Australia) Lou Molina	Volkswagen	148
DNF	52	A.G. Reynolds	(Australia) Tony Reynolds (Australia) A Humphries (Australia) Frank McEnroe	Morris 850	101
DNF	46	High Road Auto Port	(Australia) Jack Anderson (Australia) J Binning (Australia) Bob Bullock	Triumph Herald	13

== Statistics ==
- Fastest Lap - #3 Algie/Hibbard - 2:42
- Race Time - 8:15:16.0
