= 1961 Armstrong 500 =

Motor race in Australia

Seasons
- ← 1960 1962 →

The 1961 Armstrong 500 was an endurance motor race for standard production sedans. The event was held at the Phillip Island circuit in Victoria, Australia on 19 November 1961 over 167 laps of the 3.0 mile circuit, a total of 501 miles (807 km). The race was organised by the Light Car Club of Australia and was sponsored by Armstrong York Engineering Pty Ltd.

It was the second event held in the combined history of the Bathurst 1000, which had begun the previous year with the first Armstrong 500. Interest had waned since the previous year with the entry for this year the lowest in the races history until the fields were restricted to V8 Supercars only in 1995.

Geoff Russell and David Anderson backed up their 1960 class victory in their Peugeot 403 by winning their class again. Bob Jane and Harry Firth were the only combination to complete the full race distance, earning the pair the first of their four outright race wins, although the concept of outright race win would not be officially recognised until 1965. Mercedes-Benz, Studebaker and Renault all took their first class wins.

== Class structure ==
=== Class A ===
Class A was for cars with an engine capacity over 2600cc. The class featured Ford Customline, Studebaker Lark and Vauxhall Velox.

=== Class B ===
Class B was for cars with an engine capacity between 1601cc and 2600cc. The class featured Ford Falcon, Holden EK and Mercedes-Benz 220SE.

=== Class C ===
Class C was for cars with an engine capacity of between 1001cc and 1600cc. The class featured Morris Major, Peugeot 403, Simca Montlhery and Volkswagen 1200.

=== Class D ===
Class D was for cars with an engine capacity of 1000cc or less. The class featured Ford Anglia, Morris 850, Renault Gordini and Triumph Herald.

== Results ==
Pos.	No.	Entrant	Drivers	Car	Laps
Class A
1	43	York Motors (Sales) Pty Ltd	David McKay; Brian Foley	Studebaker Lark	166
2	41	WF Coad	Frank Coad; John Roxburgh	Vauxhall Velox	165
3	44	Canada Cycle & Motor Co (Sales) Pty Ltd	Fred Sutherland; Bill Graetz	Studebaker Lark	165
DNF	42	SP Boyd-Squires	Peter Boyd-Squires; Peter Will	Ford Customline	
Class B
1	32	Autoland Pty Ltd	Bob Jane; Harry Firth	Mercedes-Benz 220SE	167
2	35	KJ Harper	Ken Harper; Syd Fisher; John Raeburn	Ford Falcon XK	161
Disq	33	Stan Jones Motors Pty Ltd	Ian Strachan; John Lanyon	Holden EK	134
Class C
1	24	GLA Russell	Geoff Russell; Dave Anderson	Peugeot 403	163
2	26	W Coe	Bill Coe; Ron Lilley	Peugeot 403	161
3	22	Ecurie - BJ Auto Service, Eiffel Tower Group, Martins Panel Service	Bob Brown; Lionel Marsh; Michael Lempriere	Simca Montlhery	160
4	25	Killara Motor Garage	Bob Holden; Ken Brigden; Albert Bridge	Peugeot 403	153
5	21	G Reynolds	George Reynolds; Greg Cusack	Volkswagen	152
DNF	27	JP Gray	Charlie Smith; Bruce Maher; Tony Osborne	Morris Major	141
DNF	28	EA Clay	Eddie Clay; Jack French; Jim Gray	Morris Major	135
Class D
1	3	Monash Service Station	Jim Gullan; Brian Sampson; John Connolly	Renault Gordini	157
2	4	W McB March	Bill March; Norm Beechey	Renault Gordini	156
3	9	JGR Poulton	George Poulton; Joe Vanaria	Triumph Herald	155
4	10	Autoland Pty Ltd	Bill Jane; Norm Henthorn; Jim White	Triumph Herald	155
5	15	Alan Coffey Motors	Lou Molina; Doug Whiteford	Ford Anglia	152
6	2	Ian W Robertson	Les Park; Stan Martin	Renault Gordini	150
7	11	Viscount Motors Pty Ltd	Alan Caelli; J Edwards; M Watson	Ford Anglia	149
8	14	KF Lott	Kevin Lott; Brian Devlin; Peter Candy	Ford Anglia	148
9	12	Hilltop Auto	John Brindley; Lou Burke	Ford Anglia	148
10	16	Alan Coffey Motors	Peter Coffey; Ian Trudinger	Ford Anglia	146
11	7	HNE Johannesen	Neil Johannesen; Graham Mills; Jacques Sapir	Morris 850	136
Disq	8	G Reynolds	Hoot Gibson; Paul England	Triumph Herald	12

Note: There was no outright winner, with only the winners of the four classes being given official recognition and prize money. However the Mercedes-Benz 220SE driven by Bob Jane and Harry Firth was the only car to complete the full 500-mile distance and it is generally considered to be the "winner" of the race.

== Statistics ==
- Fastest Lap - #32 Jane/Firth - 2:41 - Laps 14 & 121
- Race Time - 8:00:31
