= Doug Chivas =

Australian racing driver

Douglas Gordon Chivas (c.1922–2004) was an Australian rally and racing car driver. Chivas drove the first Lotus Mark 6 in Australia in the early 1950s winning many races.

== Career ==
In the 1960s and 1970s, Chivas drove for some of the most important racing and rally teams in the country, including the Mitsubishi works rally team, Alec Mildren's Alfa Romeo team, the Holden Dealer Team and the factory-supported Chrysler Series Production teams of the early 1970s.

Chivas won the 1967 Surfers Paradise Four Hour race with Kevin Bartlett in a Mildren team Alfa Romeo Giulia Super. He registered class wins at the Bathurst 500 in 1963, 1967 and 1968 and won a hard-fought final round of the Toby Lee Series in 1971 driving a Chrysler Valiant Charger E38.

In 1972, Chivas achieved the best result for the Chrysler team at Bathurst by finishing third outright and second in class in a Charger E49.

Chivas is best remembered however for a sensational second place at the 1973 Hardie-Ferodo 1000. While co-driving with Peter Brock in the Holden Dealer Team's leading LJ Torana GTR XU-1 the car ran out of fuel and had to be pushed by Chivas, unaided (as per the rules), along part of pit lane that went slightly uphill. The exhausted 51-year-old had to be supported by pit crew after the effort of pushing the car in the hot conditions (and being flung aside by an anxious Brock), but the time lost may have cost the Brock/Chivas Torana a Bathurst victory. Chivas had been sent a message via his pit board to "GET MAX LAPS", but went one lap too far and ran out of fuel at the Reid Park section of the 6.172 km (3.835 mi) Mount Panorama Circuit, though luckily from there most of the over 3 km back to the pits was downhill. According to popular theory, the car should have coasted into the pits without the need for Chivas to get out and push, but he tried to bump start the car just before he got to the pits hoping there was enough fuel left to re-start; the car came to a stop about 20 metres short of the pit entry.

== Career results ==
=== Complete Bathurst 500/1000 results ===
Year	Team	Co-drivers	Car	Class	Laps	Pos.	Class pos.
1963		(Australia) Ken Wilkinson	Morris Cooper	B	125	6th	1st
1965		(Australia) Phil Barnes	Morris Cooper S	C	10	DNF	DNF
1966	(Australia) Vern Potts	(Australia) Doug Chivas, Jr.	Morris Cooper	B	119	17th	2nd
1967	(Australia) Alec Mildren Alfa Romeo	(Australia) Max Stewart	Alfa Romeo 1600 GTV	E	130	3rd	1st
1968	(Australia) Alec Mildren Racing Pty Ltd	(Australia) Kevin Bartlett	Alfa Romeo 1750 GTV	E	129	4th	1st
1969	(Australia) Alec Mildren Alfa Romeo	(Australia) John French	Alfa Romeo 1750 GTV	E	0	DNF	DNF
1970	(Australia) Geoghegan's Sporty Cars	(Australia) Graham Ryan	Chrysler VG Valiant Pacer 2-Barrel	C	129	4th	2nd
1971	(Australia) Liverpool Chrysler	(Australia) Graham Moore	Chrysler VH Valiant Charger R/T E38	D	124	19th	12th
1972	(Australia) D Beck	(Australia) Damon Beck	Chrysler VH Valiant Charger R/T E49	D	128	3rd	2nd
1973	(Australia) Holden Dealer Team	(Australia) Peter Brock	Holden LJ Torana GTR XU-1	D	163	2nd	2nd
1976	(Australia) City Ford	(Australia) Lakis Manticas	Ford Capri Mk.I	2001cc – 3000cc	3	DNF	DNF
1977	(Australia) Bill Patterson Racing	(Australia) Tony Roberts	Holden LH Torana SL/R 5000 L34	3001cc – 6000cc	154	7th	6th
1978	Citizen Watches Australia Pty Ltd	(Australia) Gary Cooke	Holden LX Torana SS A9X 4-Door	A	158	4th	4th
