= 1964 Armstrong 500 =

Motor race in Australia

Seasons
- ← 1963 1965 →

Layout of the Mount Panorama Circuit (1938–1986)

The 1964 Armstrong 500 was a production car race held on 4 October 1964 at the Mount Panorama Circuit just outside Bathurst in New South Wales, Australia. The 500 mile race was open to Australian built production sedans of which 100 examples had been registered. It was the fifth Armstrong 500 and the second to be held at Bathurst although it is commonly referred to as the fifth "Bathurst 500".

Official results reflected only class placings, with no outright winner recognized by the organizing body, the Australian Racing Drivers’ Club. The first car to complete the full 130 lap distance race was a factory backed Ford Cortina GT driven by Bob Jane and George Reynolds, the 1964 event being the fourth consecutive Armstrong 500 in which Jane had achieved an unofficial "line honours" victory.

== Class structure ==
Cars competed in four classes based on the purchase price of the vehicle in Australian pounds. There was little change from the 1963 race. Class A entries proliferated, taking up space on the grid from a shrinking Class B. Ford Australia had a strong presence in Class C with three factory entered Cortina GTs.

=== Class A ===
The up to £900 class was composed of Hillman Imp, Morris 850, NSU Prinz, Vauxhall Viva and Volkswagen Beetle.

=== Class B ===
The £901 to £1,000 class featured Ford Cortina 1500, Morris Cooper, Renault R8 and Simca Aronde.

=== Class C ===
The £1,001 to £1,200 class included only Ford Cortina GT and Holden EH entries.

=== Class D ===
The £1,201 to £2,000 class featured Chrysler Valiant, Citroën ID19, Ford Zephyr, Humber Vogue Sports, Holden EH Premier, Studebaker Lark, Triumph 2000 and Vauxhall Velox.

== Race ==
While the V8 powered Studebaker Larks again led early, fragile brakes saw them overtaken by the leading Cortinas as the race wore on. The Cortina driven by the Geoghegan brothers fell from the mid-race lead after a generator bracket broke, allowing teammates Jane and Reynolds into the race lead they would go onto win the race in Ford Cortina. Barry Seton and Herb Taylor finished second ahead of Jane's former partner Harry Firth co-driving the third factory Ford with John Reaburn. In the other three classes, the early leaders each retained their leads throughout the day. Bert Needham and Warren Weldon brought their Class D winning Studebaker home as fourth car across the line, two laps down on Jane/Reynolds and a lap behind Firth/Reaburn. Charlie Smith and Bruce Maher won Class B, leading home a 1-2-3-4 for Morris Cooper ahead of four Renault R8s. Smith/Maher finished just six laps behind the Cortina GTs. Class A was dominated by Vauxhall, with the Viva of Spencer Martin and Bill Brown leading home five other examples. Seven cars failed to finish the event, with another being disqualified.

== Results ==
As follows:

Pos	No	Entrant	Drivers	Car	Laps
Class A
1	46	Boyded Pty. Ltd.	(Australia) Spencer Martin (Australia) Bill Brown	Vauxhall HA Viva	116
2	55	Boyded Pty. Ltd.	(Australia) Ron Clarke (Australia) Brian Muir	Vauxhall HA Viva	115
3	58	Clinton Motors Pty. Ltd.	(Australia) John Marchiori (Australia) Arnold Ahrenfeld	Vauxhall HA Viva	114
4	56	Boyded Pty. Ltd.	(Australia) Tony Simmons (Australia) Mike Champion	Vauxhall HA Viva	114
5	54	Apex Autos (Newcastle)	(Australia) Jack Gates (Australia) Mike Nedelko	Vauxhall HA Viva	114
6	44	Bill Warren Austin Spares	(Australia) C. McLean (Australia) George Murray	Vauxhall HA Viva	112
7	40	Lennox Motors Pty. Ltd.	(Australia) Brian Milton (Australia) David Walker	Volkswagen 1200	112
8	47	Peter Williamson Pty. Ltd.	(Australia) Midge Bosworth (Australia) Peter Williamson	Hillman Imp	112
9	41	Wal Truscott & Co. Pty. Ltd.	(Australia) Chris McSorley (Australia) Phil West	Hillman Imp	110
10	59	Stradbroke Motors	(Australia) Lionel Ayers (Australia) Dennis Geary	Hillman Imp	110
11	43	Denlo Motors Pty. Ltd.	(Australia) Bernie Haehnle (Australia) Neil McKay	Volkswagen 1200	110
12	38	Lanock Motors Ltd.	(Australia) Barry Ferguson (Australia) Bill Ford	Volkswagen 1200	109
13	49	Buckle Motors Pty. Ltd.	(Australia) Brian Reed (Australia) Lorraine Hill	Hillman Imp	108
14	51	Wal Truscott & Co. Pty. Ltd.	(Australia) Paul Bolton (Australia) John Schroder	Hillman Imp	107
15	42	Kinsley Pty. Ltd.	(Australia) George Forrest (Australia) Frank Hann	Volkswagen 1200	105
16	50	Scuderia Octagon	(Australia) Matt Daddo (Australia) Keith Russell	Morris 850	104
DNF	39	Ryan Equipment Coy.	(Australia) Bryan Thomson (Australia) Bruce Wilson	NSU Prinz	94
DNF	52	Vaughan & Lane Pty. Ltd.	(Australia) Peter Cray (Australia) Phil Barnes	Morris 850	
DNF	53	White Nicholson BMC	(Australia) Bill Stanley (Australia) Steve Harvey	Morris 850	
DNF	57	Vaughan & Lane Pty. Ltd.	(Australia) Eric Lane (Australia) Stan Pomroy	Morris 850	15
DNF	45	W. G. Orr	(Australia) Lex Bailey (Australia) Bill Orr	Hillman Imp	0
DNS	48	Fairfield Motors Pty. Ltd.	(Australia) Kennedy (Australia) Stewart	Ford Anglia	-
Class B
1	26	Ron Ward Pty. Ltd.	(Australia) Bruce Maher (Australia) Charlie Smith	Morris Cooper	124
2	36	P. & R. Williams Pty. Ltd.	(Australia) Don Holland (Australia) Laurie Stewart	Morris Cooper	123
3	23	College Auto Port	(Australia) Ray Kaleda (Australia) Barry Thiele	Morris Cooper	121
4	33	W. Blomfield	(Australia) Warren Blomfield (Australia) Jerry Trevor-Jones	Morris Cooper	120
5	34	W. March	(Australia) Bill March (Australia) John White	Renault R8	120
6	35	R. Emmett	(Australia) John Connolly (Australia) Rex Emmett	Renault R8	120
7	28	Killara Motor Garage	(Australia) Bob Holden (Australia) Keith Pascall	Renault R8	119
8	29	G.P. Cars	(Australia) Brian Fleming (Australia) Bill Gates	Renault R8	119
9	32	P. Brown	(Australia) Peter Brown (Australia) Ray Gulson	Morris Cooper	118
10	37	L. Park Tyre Service Pty. Ltd.	(Australia) Les Park (Australia) John Roxburgh	Renault R8	117
11	30	Ira L. & A. C. Berk Pty. Ltd.	(Australia) Jim Bonthorne (Australia) John Dando	Ford Cortina Mk.I 1500	116
12	27	M. Martin	(Australia) Mike Martin (Australia) John Prisk	Morris Cooper	114
13	25	Alton Boddenberg	(Australia) Alton Boddenberg (Australia) Digby Cooke	Simca Aronde	112
14	31	Sentinel Motors	(Australia) David Burton (Australia) Brian McGrath	Renault R8	103
DNS	24	Dennis Summers Conversions	(Australia) Doug Chivas (Australia) unknown	Morris Cooper	-
Class C
1	15	Ford Motor Coy. of Aust. Pty. Ltd.	(Australia) Bob Jane (Australia) George Reynolds	Ford Cortina Mk.I GT	130
2	18	Fairfield Motors Pty. Ltd.	(Australia) Barry Seton (Australia) Herb Taylor	Ford Cortina Mk.I GT	130
3	19	Ford Motor Coy. of Aust. Pty. Ltd.	(Australia) Harry Firth (Australia) John Reaburn	Ford Cortina Mk.I GT	129
4	22	Ron Hodgson Motors Pty. Ltd.	(Australia) Ron Hodgson (Australia) John French	Ford Cortina Mk.I GT	127
5	21	Ford Motor Coy. of Aust. Pty. Ltd.	(Australia) Ian Geoghegan (Australia) Leo Geoghegan	Ford Cortina Mk.I GT	127
6	20	Frank Delandro Pty. Ltd.	(Australia) Bruce McPhee (Australia) Barry Mulholland	Ford Cortina Mk.I GT	126
7	16	W. H. Lober & Co. Pty. Ltd.	(Australia) Phil Ismay (Australia) Bob Skelton	Holden EH 179	101
DNF	14	Beautihome (Australia) Constructions Co.	(Australia) Anthony Cooper (Australia) Joe Hills	Ford Cortina Mk.I GT	
DSQ	13	J. Turner & Sons Pty. Ltd.	(Australia) Ian Grant (Australia) Peter Mitchell	Holden EH 179	10
DNS	17	H. Budd	(Australia) Budda (Australia) Smith	Holden EH S4	-
Class D
1	11	Needham's Motors Pty. Ltd.	(Australia) Warren Weldon (Australia) Bert Needham	Studebaker Lark	128
2	8	Canada Cycle & Motor Co. (Sales) Pty. Ltd.	(Australia) Fred Sutherland (Australia) Allan Mottram	Studebaker Lark	126
3	9	Buckle Motors	(Australia) Brian Foley (Australia) Bill Buckle	Citroën ID19	124
4	2	Jubilee Motors Pty. Ltd.	(Australia) Bill Burns (Australia) Brian Lawler	Ford Zephyr Mk III	123
5	1	British & Continental Cars Pty. Ltd.	(Australia) Arthur Davis (Australia) Paul Mander	Triumph 2000	123
6	4	Selke Motors	(Australia) Bob Cook (Australia) Alwyn Rose	Chrysler SV1 Valiant	123
7	7	Alex Strachan Motors	(Australia) Bill Barnett (Australia) Don Johnston	Humber Vogue Sports	119
8	10	Ecurie Australie	(Australia) Lex Davison (Australia) Rocky Tresise	Triumph 2000	117
9	3	Reg Smith Motors Pty. Ltd.	(Australia) Tony Allen (Australia) Tony Reynolds	Triumph 2000	116
10	5	M. C. Stewart	(Australia) Bob Salter (Australia) Max Stewart	Triumph 2000	105
11	6	Stack & Coy. Ltd.	(Australia) Lyndon McLeod (Australia) Lionel Williams	Holden EH Premier	95
DNF	12	Alec Mildren Racing Pty. Ltd.	(Australia) Ralph Sach (Australia) Max Brunninghausen	Vauxhall Velox	

The Team Prize was won by the three Ford Motor Co. entered Ford Cortina GTs driven by Jane/Reynolds, Seton/Taylor and Firth/Raeburn.

== Statistics ==
- Fastest Lap - #21 Geoghegan/Geoghegan - 3:21.3
- Fastest "flying eighth mile" speed was achieved by the Studebaker Lark of Warren Weldon & Bert Needham at 114.65 mph
- Race Time - No time published by the ARDC
