= 1973 Hardie-Ferodo 1000 =

Motor race in Australia

Seasons
- ← 1972 1974 →

Layout of the Mount Panorama Circuit (1938–1986)

The 1973 Hardie-Ferodo 1000 was the 14th running of the Bathurst 1000 touring car race. This was the first race to be held under the new metric

Allan Moffat claimed his third win in the event and Ian Geoghegan his first. They shared a Ford Falcon GT. It was the seventh and final win for the factory Ford Australia racing team. Peter Brock and Doug Chivas dropped from contention after their Holden Torana ran out of fuel, forcing Chivas to push the car uphill along the pit lane to make it to the Holden Dealer Team pit bay. Brock and Chivas finished on the same lap as Moffat and Ian Geoghegan, ahead of their teammates Colin Bond and Leo Geoghegan, also on the same lap, in third position.

== Class structure ==
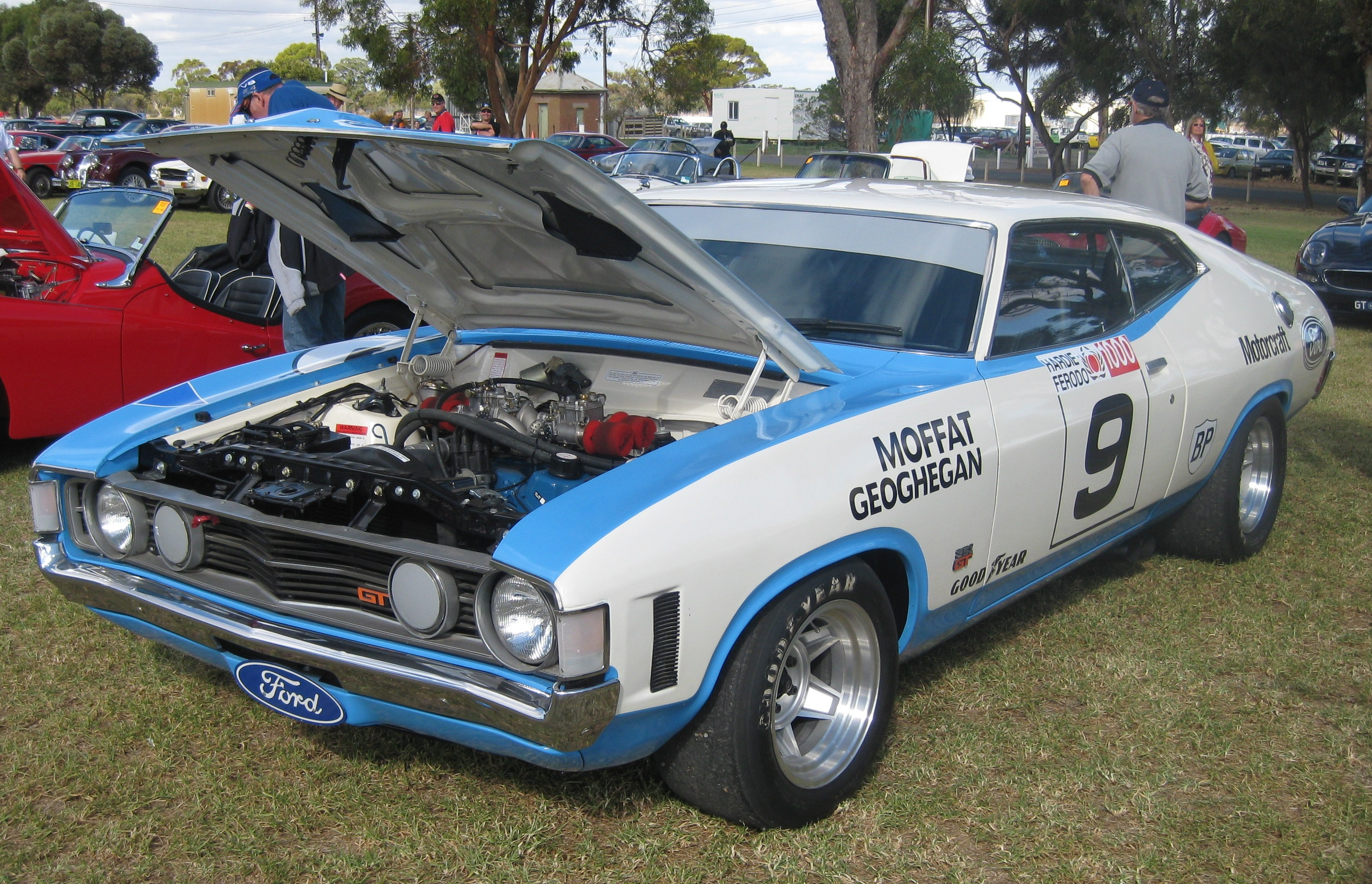
Replica of the race winning Ford XA Falcon GT Hardtop

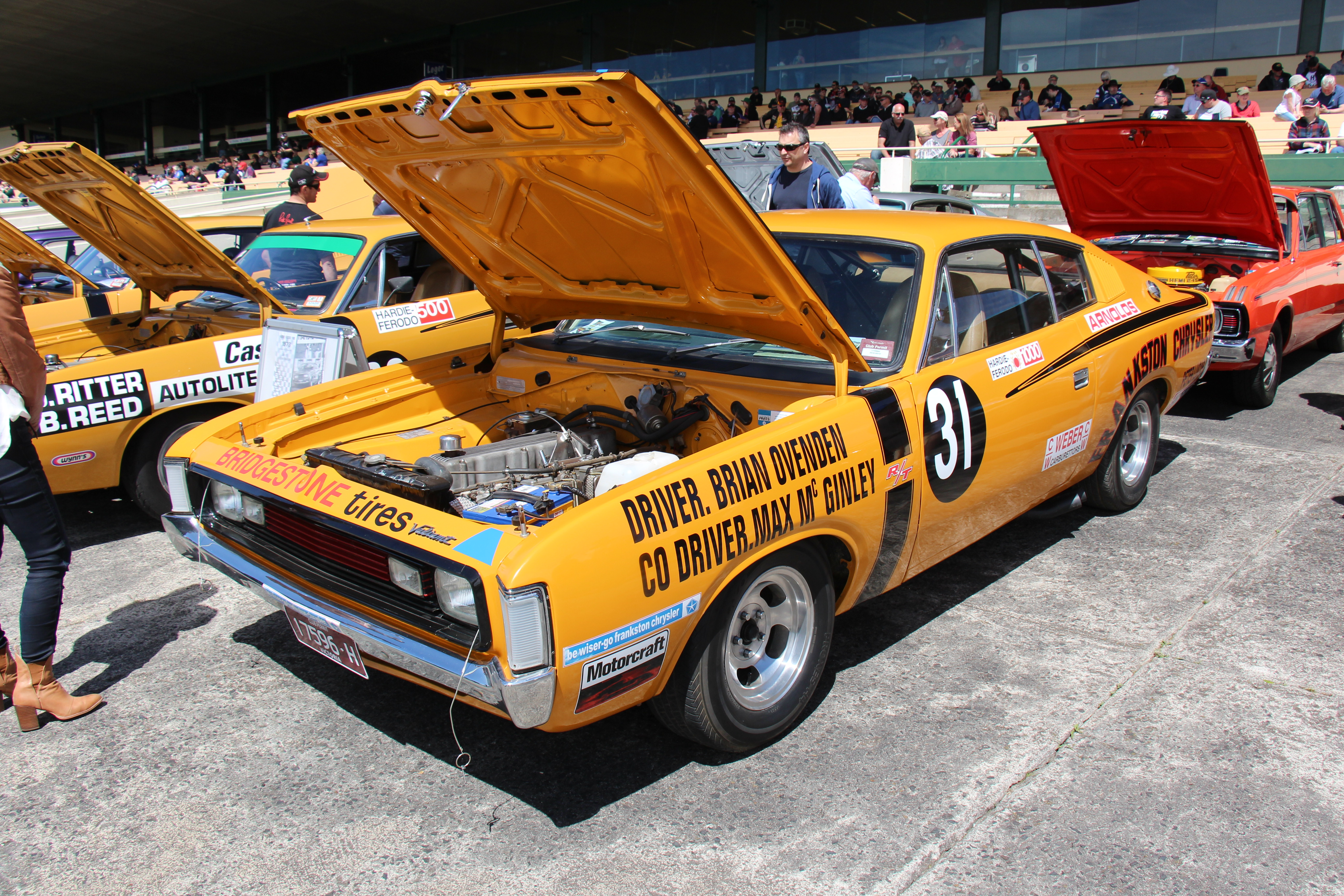
The Chrysler Valiant Charger R/T E49 which was driven to 11th place by Brian Ovenden and Max McGinley

=== Class A ===
For cars up to 1300cc capacity, it was contested by Datsun 1200, Fiat 128, Honda Civic, Morris Cooper S and Renault R8.

=== Class B ===
For cars 1301cc to 2000cc, it featured Alfa Romeo 2000 GTV, Datsun 180B, Ford Escort, Mazda RX-3 and Subaru 1400 GSR.

=== Class C ===
For cars 2001cc to 3000cc, it was contested by 2.8 litre Holden Torana and Mazda RX-2.

=== Class D ===
For cars over 3,000cc capacity, it featured Chrysler Valiant Charger, Ford Falcon, Holden Monaro and Holden Torana GTR XU-1.

== Race ==
Pole sitter Goss got off to a great start leading the Falcons of Moffat, French and Gibson from Brock's Torana. Gibson went out early with engine trouble and French made an unscheduled stop. This left Goss to make his first stop on lap 43 with a 40-second lead over Moffat and Brock, the later pair hardly separated by more than a few seconds until Moffat spun at Griffins on lap 44, losing about 20 seconds before making his first stop on lap 45 where he handed over to Geoghegan. Brock stopped on lap 54 and handed the car over to Chivas, whom they hoped could run the car long enough to only make one more pitstop in the race and one less than the Falcons, despite Brock reporting that the fuel gauge on the car had failed. Bond momentarily took the lead of the race until making his stop on lap 61, well past a third distance proving that the Torana could do the race on just two stops.

Despite Moffat's spin and the Torana having a minute shorter pitstop than the Falcon, Geoghegan made up the difference to Chivas - taking second place from brother Leo Geoghegan (driving with Bond) and then retaking the lead of the race on lap 78. Bartlett (driving with early leader Goss) pitted on the same lap but Goss would be involved in a collision with Garth's overturned Torana and pitted for repairs on lap 105 putting them out of contention. Geoghegan was able to build a lead over Chivas before stopping and handing the car back to Moffat. Chivas held a 1'40" advantage over Moffat some time after the stop and was given the instruction from his pit board to "get max laps" only to run out of fuel on the top of the mountain and coast back to the pit entry. However, with the start of pitlane being uphill Chivas had to climb out and push the car, he also had to do this unassisted on penalty of disqualification until he himself had gotten the car far enough for his team to be allowed to assist. Moffat and Leo Geoghegan both passed Chivas as he strained to slowly push the car against the gradient after a long stint at the wheel.

Moffat made his final stop on lap 123 of just 1'24", which was over a minute faster than his first, and was able to resume still leading Bond's Torana and cruise home to victory, the only danger being the #35 Mazda RX-2 rolling over ahead of him on his final lap. Any chance of Brock putting pressure back on Moffat was thwarted by the need to make a 15-second stop for more fuel on lap 147. He did however regain second place when Bond's left rear tyre blew across the top and he had to make an unscheduled stop of 30 seconds. Brock would have his own tyre failure with the right rear blowing out on the final lap but he continued to the finish at pace knowing the car only had to survive the remainder of that lap.

Although the best surviving highlight reel of the day available now clearly promotes the narrative of a certain Holden victory being lost due to miscalculation (Chivas running out of fuel) this is questionable at best with the benefit of hindsight (the film is credited to General Motors and their sponsors at the time). Clearly Moffat slowed significantly when no longer challenged for the race lead, so while it is possible he may have had his own trouble if pressed harder, it is certainly a hollow claim that because Brock and Chivas were able to finish within a lap of Moffat and Geoghegan despite running out of fuel they lost a certain race win. The race pace of the Toranas may have been compromised by trying to run to only two stops with Geoghegan able to make up about two and a quarter minutes over Chivas in his stint alone. Brock was the only driver to not haemorrhage time to the race winner but never got close to achieving the fuel economy required for his strategy to work, falling short on both his stints by as much as 16 laps. Brock obviously would have had to slow significantly more to complete the required laps. The real victim of this narrative is the incredible effort by John Goss not being a bigger part of the story. Despite Goss building his race car in his spare time he was able to take pole position, set a new lap record and lead the factory entered cars by 40 seconds at his first pitstop. If not for some small exhaust issue, and a collision with a car that had illegally re-joined the race (after being towed), the 1973 Hardie-Ferodo 1000 may well have been celebrated as a Goss/Bartlett victory in the David versus Goliath style.

== Top 10 Qualifiers ==
Pos	No	Entrant	Driver	Car	Qual
Pole	5	McLeod Ford Pty Ltd - Shell Racing	(Australia) John Goss	Ford XA Falcon GT Hardtop	2:33.4
2	1	Holden Dealer Team	(Australia) Peter Brock	Holden LJ Torana GTR XU-1	2:34.4
3	9	Ford Motor Company Australia Ltd.	(Canada) Allan Moffat	Ford XA Falcon GT Hardtop	2:34.5
4	4	Bryan Byrt Ford Pty. Ltd.	(Australia) John French	Ford XA Falcon GT Hardtop	2:35.3
5	24	Holden Dealer Team	(Australia) Colin Bond	Holden LJ Torana GTR XU-1	2:35.4
6	7	Ron Hodgson Motors	(Australia) Bob Morris	Holden LJ Torana GTR XU-1	2:36.3
7	6	Ford Motor Company Australia Ltd.	(Australia) Fred Gibson	Ford XA Falcon GT Hardtop	2:38.2
8	19	Cessnock Motor Works Pty. Ltd.	(Australia) Allan Grice	Holden LJ Torana GTR XU-1	2:38.2
9	2	Bob Jane Racing	(Australia) Bob Jane	Holden LJ Torana GTR XU-1	2:39.3
10	3	Pacific Film Laboratories Pty. Ltd.	(Australia) Don Holland	Holden LJ Torana GTR XU-1	2:40.5

== Results ==
In part sourced from:

Pos	Class	No	Entrant	Drivers	Car	Laps	Qual Pos
1	D	9	Ford Motor Company Australia Ltd.	(Canada) Allan Moffat (Australia) Ian Geoghegan	Ford XA Falcon GT Hardtop	163	3
2	D	1	Holden Dealer Team	(Australia) Peter Brock (Australia) Doug Chivas	Holden LJ Torana GTR XU-1	163	2
3	D	24	Holden Dealer Team	(Australia) Colin Bond (Australia) Leo Geoghegan	Holden LJ Torana GTR XU-1	163	5
4	D	2	Bob Jane Racing	(Australia) Bob Jane (Australia) John Harvey	Holden LJ Torana GTR XU-1	161	9
5	D	10	Lakis Manticas	(Australia) Bob Forbes (Australia) Dick Johnson	Holden LJ Torana GTR XU-1	154	11
6	D	21	Roamer Watches Australia Pty. Ltd.	(Australia) Ray Kaleda (Australia) Peter Granger	Chrysler Valiant Charger R/T E49	150	18
7	D	15	Murray Carter - Shell Racing	(Australia) Murray Carter (Australia) Lawrie Nelson	Ford XA Falcon GT Hardtop	150	19
8	B	49	A.F. & M. Beninca Pty. Ltd.	(Australia) Ray Harrison (Australia) Mal Robertson	Alfa Romeo 2000 GTV	149	23
9	B	45	Mazda Racing Team	(Australia) Mel Mollison (Australia) Bruce Hindhaugh	Mazda RX-3	144	36
10	C	34	Bernie Haehnle	(Australia) Bernie Haehnle (Australia) Wayne Rogerson	Mazda RX-2	144	36
11	D	31	Tony Roberts Automotive Centre	(Australia) Brian Ovenden (Australia) Max McGinley	Chrysler Valiant Charger R/T E49	143	29
12	C	37	John Palmer Motors	(Australia) Bob Beasley (Australia) Enno Buesselmann	Mazda RX-2	143	39
13	B	44	Camper-Ford Pty Ltd	(Australia) Geoff Leeds (Australia) Jim Murcott	Ford Escort Twin Cam Mk.I	143	32
14	B	41	Datsun Racing Team	(Australia) John Roxburgh (Australia) Doug Whiteford	Datsun 180B SSS	143	40
15	A	56	Datsun Racing Team	(Australia) Bill Evans (Australia) James Laing-Peach	Datsun 1200	142	46
16	A	55	Formula 1 Europa Garage	(Australia) Lakis Manticas (Australia) Peter Lander	Fiat 128SL	142	43
17	C	33	W.H. Motors Pty. Ltd.	(Australia) Herb Taylor (Australia) Don Smith	Holden LC Torana GTR XU-1	141	28
18	D	3	Pacific Film Laboratories Pty. Ltd.	(Australia) Don Holland (Australia) Max Stewart	Holden LJ Torana GTR XU-1	141	10
19	B	39	Ray Gulson	(Australia) Ray Gulson (Australia) Peter Brown	Alfa Romeo 2000 GTV	140	27
20	D	29	Peter Kilmore	(Australia) Peter Kilmore (Australia) Kevin Kennedy	Holden LJ Torana GTR XU-1	138	41
21	A	66	Clement Motors	(Australia) David Clement (Australia) Neil Mason	Morris Cooper S	136	50
22	A	54	Lordoco Aust Pty. Ltd.	(Australia) John Lord (New Zealand) Peter Janson	Honda Civic	134	53
23	B	38	Chris Heyer	(Australia) Chris Heyer (Australia) Peter Mill	Subaru 1400 GSR	133	55
24	A	63	Bennet & Wood Pty. Ltd.	(Australia) Ken Brian (Australia) Noel Riley	Honda Civic	131	52
25	A	68	Bob Williamson	(Australia) Chick Audsley (Australia) Bob Williamson	Morris Cooper S	131	56
26	A	67	Caroline O'Shanesy	(Australia) Caroline O'Shanesy (Australia) Peter Williamson	Morris Cooper S	131	57
27	A	64	David Frazer	(Australia) David Frazer (Australia) Bob Edgerton	Renault R8 Gordini	130	49
28	B	43	Bryan Byrt Ford Pty. Ltd.	(Australia) Bob Holden (Australia) Lyndon Arnel	Ford Escort Twin Cam Mk.I	129	44
29	B	48	Mazda Racing Team	(Australia) Geoff Perry (Australia) Brian Reed	Mazda RX-3	126	34
30	A	59	Phillip Arnull	(Australia) John Symon (Australia) Philip Arnull	Datsun 1200	125	58
DNF	C	35	James Mason Motors	(Australia) Gary Cooke (Australia) Len Searle	Mazda RX-2	142	38
DNF	D	8	Muirs Motors (Ashfield) Pty. Ltd.	(Australia) Ron Dickson (Australia) Bob Stevens	Holden HQ Monaro GTS	130	20
DNF	B	50	Chesterfield Filter Racing	(Australia) Herb Vines (Australia) Chris Batger	Ford Escort Twin Cam Mk.I	116	54
DNF	D	5	McLeod Ford Pty. Ltd. - Shell Racing	(Australia) John Goss (Australia) Kevin Bartlett	Ford XA Falcon GT Hardtop	110	1
DNF	D	4	Bryan Byrt Ford Pty. Ltd.	(Australia) John French (Australia) Bob Skelton	Ford XA Falcon GT Hardtop	91	4
DNF	A	57	Geoff Newton	(Australia) Geoff Newton (Australia) Cam Richardson	Morris Cooper S	89	51
DNF	D	17	G. Ryan	(Australia) Graham Ryan (Australia) Ray Lintott	Holden LJ Torana GTR XU-1	89	14
DNF	D	26	Ray Thackwell Racing	(New Zealand) Ray Thackwell (Australia) Barry Coleman	Holden LJ Torana GTR XU-1	89	22
DNF	A	58	Jack Haywood	(Australia) Lynn Brown (Australia) Paul Hamilton	Morris Cooper S	77	45
DNF	C	36	McLeod Kelso & Lee Pty. Ltd.	(Australia) Bruce Stewart (Australia) George Garth	Holden LC Torana GTR	75	31
DNF	D	12	Dustings of Burwood	(Australia) Rod McRae (Australia) Tony Niovanni	Holden LJ Torana GTR XU-1	64	21
DNF	B	42	Strapp Ford	(Australia) Graham Ritter (Australia) Tony Farrell	Ford Escort Twin Cam Mk.I	64	25
DNF	D	27	Leo Leonard	(New Zealand) Leo Leonard (Australia) Ernie Sprague	Chrysler Valiant Charger R/T E49	62	17
DNF	D	30	John Stoopman	(Australia) John Stoopman (Australia) Dennis Martin	Holden LJ Torana GTR XU-1	61	30
DNF	D	23	Bob Holden Motors	(Australia) Jim Hunter (Australia) Phil Ward	Holden LJ Torana GTR XU-1	58	16
DNF	A	53	Rolls Motors Pty. Ltd.	(Australia) Ian Cook (Australia) Terry Finnigan	Honda Civic	56	48
DNF	D	16	Formula 1 Europa Garage	(Australia) Tony Allen (Australia) Phil Brock	Chrysler Valiant Charger R/T E49	45	13
DNF	D	19	Cessnock Motor Works Pty. Ltd.	(Australia) Allan Grice (Australia) Keith Murray	Holden LJ Torana GTR XU-1	42	8
DNF	D	13	Bruce McPhee	(Australia) Bruce McPhee (Australia) Tom Nailard	Holden LJ Torana GTR XU-1	41	15
DNF	B	47	W.D. Electrics	(Australia) Warren Thompson (Australia) Rod Dale	Ford Escort Twin Cam Mk.I	36	33
DNF	A	60	Fourway Motors Pty. Ltd.	(Australia) Gary Leggatt (Australia) Bob Wedd	Morris Cooper S	27	42
DNF	D	20	Chas Tierney Pty. Ltd.	(Australia) Ray Strong (Australia) Ron Gillard	Holden LJ Torana GTR XU-1	25	37
DNF	D	11	Geoghegans Sporty Cars	(Australia) Des West (Australia) Bill Brown	Chrysler Valiant Charger R/T E49	17	12
DNF	D	6	Ford Motor Company Australia Ltd.	(Australia) Fred Gibson (Australia) Barry Seton	Ford XA Falcon GT Hardtop	17	7
DNF	B	40	Grace Bros. Racing Team	(Australia) Christine Gibson (Australia) Sue Ransom	Alfa Romeo 2000 GTV	5	24
DNF	D	7	Ron Hodgson Motors	(Australia) Bob Morris (Australia) John Leffler	Holden LJ Torana GTR XU-1	4	6
DNF	A	66	Mini Bits	(Australia) John Dellaca (Australia) Jon Leighton	Morris Cooper S	3	47
DNF	C	25	D & P Traders Pty. Ltd.	(Australia) Pat Peck (Australia) Darrylyn Huitt	Holden LC Torana GTR	3	26
DNS	D	14	Freds Treads Pty. Ltd.	(Australia) John Duggan (Australia) Gordon Rich	Holden LJ Torana GTR XU-1		
DNS	D	28	B. Nitschke	(Australia) Bill Nitschke (Australia) John Lewis	Holden LJ Torana GTR XU-1		
DNS	B	46	Alan Cant	(Australia) Alan Cant (Australia) Tony Maw	Ford Escort Twin Cam Mk.I		
DNS	D	32	Gosford Motors Pty. Ltd.	(Australia) Kingsley Hibbard (Australia) Brian Shead	Holden LJ Torana GTR XU-1		
DNS	B	51	Barry Lee	(Australia) Barry Lee (New Zealand) Ron McPhail	Ford Escort Twin Cam Mk.I		
DNS	A	62	Pete Mac's Towing Service Pty. Ltd.	(Australia) Geoff Wade (Australia) Robin Dudfield	Morris Cooper S		

== Statistics ==
- Pole Position - #5 John Goss - 2:33.4
- Fastest Lap - #5 John Goss - 2:34.8 (141.86 kph) - Lap 2 (lap record)
- Average Speed - 137 km/h
- Race time of winning car - 7:20:06.8 (135.55 kph)
