= 1963 Armstrong 500 =

Motor race in Australia

Seasons
- ← 1962 1964 →

Layout of the Mount Panorama Circuit (1938–1986)

The 1963 Armstrong 500 was the fourth running of the Armstrong 500 touring car race. It was held on 6 October 1963. After the 1962 race, the Phillip Island Grand Prix Circuit was too damaged to continue to stage the race, forcing it to move to a new location, the Mount Panorama Circuit just outside Bathurst with a new organising club, the Australian Racing Drivers Club. The race was open to standard production sedans with four classes based on the purchase price (in Australian pounds) of the vehicle.

Bob Jane and Harry Firth were the first team to complete the full race distance, taking victory in Class C in their factory backed Ford Cortina GT, the change of both vehicle and circuit making no difference to their result of the previous year. While outright victories were not to be recognised until years later, they had completed a hat-trick of 'first to the line' wins.

== Class structure ==
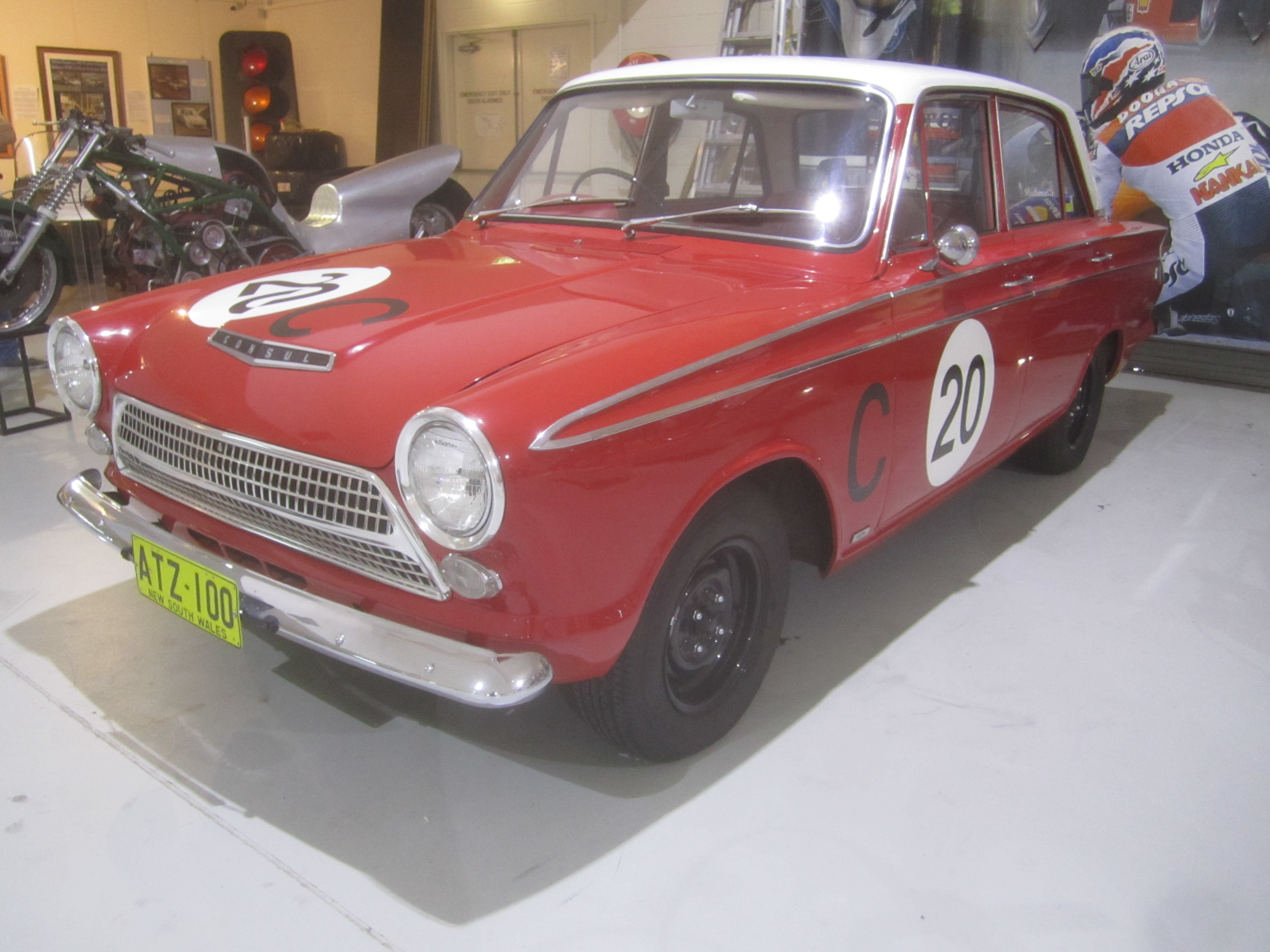
A replica of the Ford Cortina GT in which Bob Jane and Harry Firth won Class C

The largest change was cosmetic. The bigger cars moved down the alphabet, the smaller cars moved into classes A and B. The Volkswagens moved into class A. Ford Falcons disappeared from the race, replaced by an influx of smaller, more versatile Ford Cortinas. As in 1962 the Fords were the biggest threat, shaping up to be faster than the larger D Class cars which included Chrysler Valiants and Studebaker Larks.

=== Class A ===
Class A was for cars that cost less £900. It comprised Fiat 770, Morris 850, Triumph Herald and Volkswagen Beetle.

=== Class B ===
The £901 to £1,000 class featured 1.5 litre Ford Cortina, Morris Cooper and Morris Major Elite, Renault R8 and Simca Aronde.

=== Class C ===
The £1,001 to £1,200 class was contested by Ford Cortina GT, Holden EH S4 and Holden FB.

=== Class D ===
The £1,201 to £2,000 class featured Chrysler Valiant, Ford Zephyr, Humber Super Snipe, Peugeot 404, Studebaker Lark, Vauxhall Velox and Vauxhall VX 4/90.

== Race ==
The race became the first Ford vs Holden head-to-head fight, with the works Cortina of defending race champions Bob Jane and Harry Firth winning by a lap over the first EH Holden of Ralph Sach and Fred Morgan with a second Cortina on the same lap. It was a third consecutive victory for Jane and Firth, each victory coming in a different model and back-to-back for the factory Ford team. Second place was the closest Holden would get to a win until the breakthrough in 1968. Chrysler got its first class win with the Valiant of Tony Reynolds and Tony Allen with Geoff Russell driving the factory prepared Ford Zephyr again narrowly missing out on the Class D win. The new Morris Coopers saw the Mini break out of the entry level class and gave Doug Chivas his first class win, co-driving with Ken Wilkinson in Class B, defeating the 1.5 litre Cortinas, ominously just a lap behind the Valiant and the Zephyr. In the small class, Volkswagen again defeated the Morris 850s with Barry Ferguson and Bill Ford taking first place ahead of the Mini of Don Holland and Lindsay Little.

== Results ==
Pos	No	Entrant	Drivers	Car	Laps
Class A
1	54	Lanock Motors Ltd	(Australia) Barry Ferguson (Australia) Bill Ford	Volkswagen 1200	116
2	55	Vaughan & Lane Pty Ltd	(Australia) Don Holland (Australia) Lindsay Little	Morris 850	116
3	51	Victorian VW Agents-VW Sales	(Australia) Jim McKeown (Australia) George Reynolds	Volkswagen 1200	115
4	61	A. Andrews	(Australia) Rocky Tresise (Australia) Arthur Andrews	Volkswagen 1200	115
5	57	Macquarie Motors	(Australia) Greg Mackie (Australia) Graham White	Volkswagen 1200	113
6	53	K.B. Nicholson Motors	(Australia) Bill Stanley (Australia) John Alexander	Morris 850	113
7	49	H.E. Taylor	(Australia) Barry Seton (Australia) Herb Taylor	Morris 850	112
8	50	Kinsley Motors	(Australia) George Forrest (Australia) Frank Hann	Volkswagen 1200	111
9	59	T. Corcoran	(Australia) Tom Corcoran (Australia) Digby Cooke	Morris 850	111
10	52	Paul M. Samuels	(Australia) Barry Collerson (Australia) Les Howard	Fiat 770	103
11	56	Reg Smith Motors	(Australia) Jim Bonthorne (Australia) Mike Callan	Triumph Herald	101
12	58	Vaughan & Lane Pty Ltd	(Australia) Fred Gibson (Australia) Ken Nicholson	Morris 850	89
DNF	60	P & R Williams	(Australia) Tony Hill (Australia) Frank Kleinig	Morris 850	
Class B
1	42	Denis Summers Conversions	(Australia) Doug Chivas (Australia) Ken Wilkinson	Morris Cooper	125
2	41	Delore Motors (Newcastle)	(Australia) Jack Gates (Australia) Mike Nedelko	Morris Cooper	125
3	28	Ford Motor Co. of Australia	(Australia) Ern Abbott (Australia) Alan Caelli	Ford Cortina 1500	123
4	46	Ford Motor Co. of Australia	(Australia) Max Volkers (Australia) K Burns	Ford Cortina 1500	123
5	43	Bamar Motors	(Australia) Wal Donnelly (Australia) John Marchiori	Morris Cooper	122
6	44	P & R Williams	(Australia) Des West (Australia) John Martin	Morris Cooper	120
7	26	C. Harding	(Australia) Chris Harding (Australia) Adrian Yannuccelli	Morris Cooper	120
8	29	Total Team	(Australia) Frank Matich (Australia) George Murray	Renault R8	119
9	37	Rex Emmett	(Australia) John Connolly (Australia) Rod Draper	Renault R8	119
10	39	P & R Williams	(Australia) Brian Foley (Australia) Peter Manton	Morris Cooper	116
11	45	P. Brown	(Australia) Peter Brown (Australia) Ron Marshall	Morris Cooper	115
12	47	C.G. Smith	(Australia) Ron Hodgson (Australia) Charlie Smith	Morris Cooper	115
13	32	Cecil R Pierce	(Australia) Ken Brigden (Australia) Bruce Smith	Simca Aronde	114
14	38	Gurdon Motors	(Australia) Barry Gurdon (Australia) Jerry Trevor-Jones	Morris Major Elite	113
15	33	Gurdon Motors	(Australia) Jack Murray (Australia) Alan Edney	Morris Major Elite	113
16	48	Gurdon Motors	(Australia) Warren Blomfield (Australia) Lorraine Hill	Morris Major Elite	112
17	36	Ron Thorp's Bargain Barn	(Australia) Ron Thorp (Australia) John White	Morris Major Elite	111
18	40	Rex Emmett	(Australia) Les Park (Australia) Fred Sutherland	Renault Gordini	110
19	25	Scuderia Veloce	(Australia) Ron Clarke (Australia) David Walker	Renault R8	102
DNF	30	Delore Motors (Newcastle)	(Australia) Doug Kelley (Australia) Graham Kelley	Morris Cooper	
DNF	34	Total Bexley Service Station	(Australia) Mike Martin (Australia) Dave Humphries	Morris Cooper	
DNF	35	Howard and Sons Racing Team	(Australia) Sid Howard (Australia) Les Weiley	Morris Cooper	18
DNF	27	P. & R. Williams	(Australia) Paul Bolton (Australia) Laurie Stewart	Morris Cooper	13
DNF	31	Three Way Motors	(Australia) Carl Kennedy (Australia) Doug Stewart	Simca Aronde	
Class C
1	20	Ford Motor Co. of Australia	(Australia) Bob Jane (Australia) Harry Firth	Ford Cortina Mk.I GT	130
2	15	F.G. Morgan	(Australia) Ralph Sach (Australia) Fred Morgan	Holden EH S4	129
3	13	Grawill Motors Pty. Ltd.	(Australia) Bruce McPhee (Australia) Graham Ryan	Ford Cortina Mk.I GT	129
4	22	Barrie Broomhall Motors	(Australia) Barry Broomhall (Australia) Bill Cunliffe	Ford Cortina Mk.I GT	124
5	18	H. Budd	(Australia) Harry Budd (Australia) R. Smith	Holden EH S4	123
6	23	Geissler Motors Pty. Ltd.	(Australia) Ian Grant (Australia) Trevor Marden	Holden EH S4	120
7	16	Muirs Motors (Ryde)	(Australia) Kevin Bartlett (Australia) Bill Reynolds	Holden EH S4	115
8	24	B.P. Warwick Farm Service Station	(Australia) Lex Bailey (Australia) Phil McCumisky	Holden FB Special	115
9	17	Heldon Motors Pty. Ltd.	(Australia) Spencer Martin (Australia) Brian Muir	Holden EH S4	111
DNF	21	Ford Motor Co. of Australia	(Australia) Ian Geoghegan (Australia) Leo Geoghegan	Ford Cortina Mk.I GT	105
DNF	14	Seatons Globe Hotel, Albury	(Australia) Jim O'Shaunnessy (Australia) John Brindley	Holden EH S4	65
Class D
1	8	Ron Dunbier Motors	(Australia) Tony Allen (Australia) Tony Reynolds	Chrysler AP5 Valiant	126
2	5	Ford Motor Co. of Australia	(Australia) Geoff Russell (Australia) John Reaburn	Ford Zephyr Mk.III	126
3	9	Killara Motor Garage	(Australia) Bob Holden (Australia) Bill March	Peugeot 404	119
4	2	Needham Motors Pty Ltd	(Australia) Warren Weldon (Australia) Bert Needham	Studebaker Lark	115
45	6	Alex Strachan Motors	(Australia) Bill Burns (Australia) Brian Lawler	Humber Super Snipe	21
DNF	4	Baulkham Hill Service Station	(Australia) Bob Cook (Australia) Alwyn Rose	Chrysler SV1 Valiant	119
DNF	7	N.J. Wright	(Australia) Jim Wright (Australia) Ian Ferguson	Studebaker Lark	57
DNF	3	Boyded Pty Ltd-Scuderia Veloce	(Australia) David McKay (Australia) Greg Cusack	Vauxhall Velox	20
DSQ	10	Continental & General Distributors	(Australia) Bill Coe (Australia) Syd Fisher	Peugeot 404	119
DNS	12	P. Fallu	(Australia) Paul Fallu (Australia) Terry Kratzmann	Vauxhall VX 4/90	

== Statistics ==
- Fastest Lap – N/A
- Race time of Firth / Jane Ford Cortina GT (First car across the line) – 7:47:14
