= 1975 Hardie-Ferodo 1000 =

Motor race in Australia

Seasons
- ← 1974 1976 →

Layout of the Mount Panorama Circuit (1938–1986)

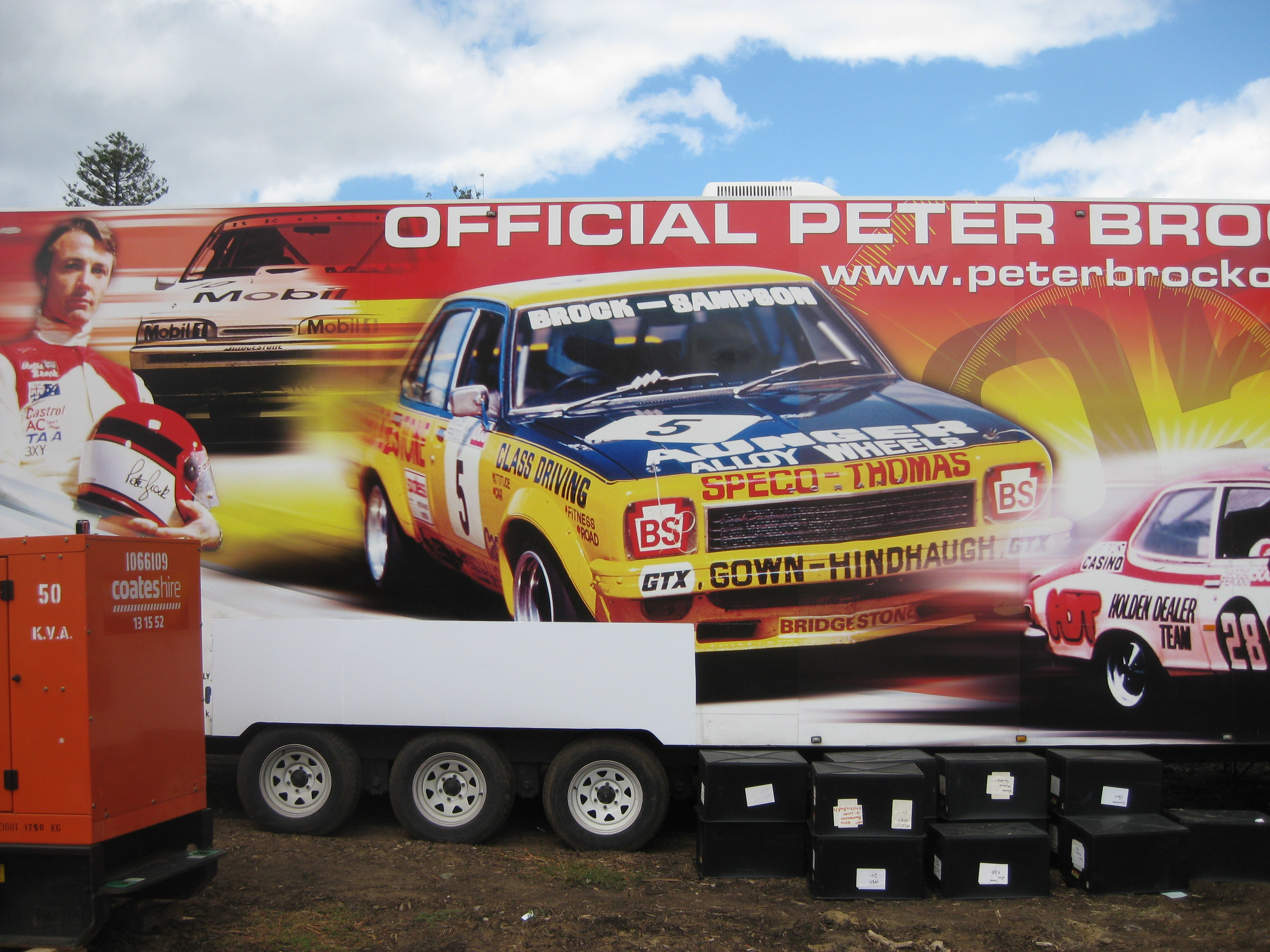
The Official Peter Brock Merchandise Truck features an image of the 1975 Hardie Ferodo 1000 winning Holden L34 Torana

The 1975 Hardie-Ferodo 1000 was the 16th running of the Bathurst 1000 touring car race. It was an endurance race for touring cars complying with CAMS Group C regulations. The event was held at the Mount Panorama Circuit just outside Bathurst, New South Wales on 5 October 1975 over a distance of 1006.036 km (163 laps × 6.172 km). The race was Round 3 of the 1975 Australian Manufacturers' Championship.

The race was won by Peter Brock, his second win, and Brian Sampson for his only Bathurst 1000 win. The pair drove their Gown - Hindhaugh entered Holden LH Torana SL/R 5000 L34 to a two-lap victory, avenging the previous year's result when the pair built up a record six-lap lead before suffering terminal engine failure on lap 118 with Brock at the wheel. Another dealership entered L34 Torana, the Ron Hodgson Motors car of Bob Morris and Frank Gardner, finished second with the Holden Dealer Team L34 Torana of Colin Bond and Johnnie Walker completing a clean sweep of the top three places for Holden.

== Class structure ==
Cars competed in four classes, defined by engine capacity:

=== Class A ===
The smallest class was for under 1300cc engine capacity. It was made up of Alfa Romeo GT Junior, Datsun 1200, Ford Escort, Honda Civic, Mazda 1300, Morris Cooper S, Toyota Corolla and Volkswagen Passat.

=== Class B ===
The under two litre class saw a mix of Alfa Romeo 2000 GTV, BMW 2002, Ford Escort RS2000, Mazda RX-3 and Triumph Dolomite.

=== Class C ===
The under three litre class featured Datsun 260Z, Ford Capri, Mazda RX-3 and Mercedes-Benz 280E.

=== Class D ===
For cars over three litres of engine capacity, the class consisted only of Holden Torana and Ford Falcon.

== Top 10 Qualifiers ==
Pos	No	Team	Driver	Car	Qual
Pole	2	Holden Dealer Team	(Australia) Colin Bond	Holden LH Torana SL/R 5000 L34	2:27.4
2	25	Allan Moffat Racing	(Canada) Allan Moffat	Ford XB Falcon GT Hardtop	2:27.5
3	5	Gown - Hindhaugh	(Australia) Peter Brock	Holden LH Torana SL/R 5000 L34	2:28.6
4	7	Ron Hodgson Motors	(Australia) Bob Morris	Holden LH Torana SL/R 5000 L34	2:31.8
5	3	Max Wright Motors Pty Ltd	(Australia) Bob Skelton	Holden LH Torana SL/R 5000 L34	2:32.0
6	12	Craven Mild Racing	(Australia) Allan Grice	Holden LH Torana SL/R 5000 L34	2:32.1
7	18	M Carter	(Australia) Murray Carter	Ford XB Falcon GT Hardtop	2:32.9
8	15	R Coppins	(New Zealand) Jim Richards	Holden LH Torana SL/R 5000 L34	2:33.4
9	4	Bob Forbes Automotive	(Australia) Bob Forbes	Holden LH Torana SL/R 5000 L34	2:33.6
10	1	John Goss Racing Pty Ltd	(Australia) John Goss	Ford XB Falcon GT Hardtop	2:33.6

== Final results ==
Final results were as follows:

Pos	Class	No	Team	Drivers	Car	Laps	Qual Pos
1	D	5	Gown - Hindhaugh	(Australia) Peter Brock (Australia) Brian Sampson	Holden LH Torana SL/R 5000 L34	163	3
2	D	7	Ron Hodgson Motors	(Australia) Bob Morris (Australia) Frank Gardner	Holden LH Torana SL/R 5000 L34	161	4
3	D	2	Marlboro Holden Dealer Team	(Australia) Colin Bond (Australia) Johnnie Walker	Holden LH Torana SL/R 5000 L34	154	1
4	D	3	Max Wright Motors Pty Ltd	(Australia) Bob Skelton (Australia) Ron Dickson	Holden LH Torana SL/R 5000 L34	152	5
5	C	6	Penrith Mazda Centre Pty Ltd	(Australia) Don Holland (Japan) Hiroshi Fushida	Mazda RX-3	151	19
6	B	27	Alfa Romeo Dealers Australia	(France) Marie-Claude Beaumont (Australia) John Leffler	Alfa Romeo 2000 GTV	150	29
7	B	50	Fischer Ford Racing	(Australia) John Bassett (Australia) Eric Boord	Ford Escort RS2000	149	20
8	D	15	R Coppins	(New Zealand) Rod Coppins (New Zealand) Jim Richards	Holden LH Torana SL/R 5000 L34	147	8
9	D	11	Tokico	(Australia) John Pollard (Australia) Bryan Thomson	Holden LH Torana SL/R 5000 L34	147	14
10	B	37	Ron Hodgson Motors	(Australia) James Laing-Peach (Australia) Graham Moore	Triumph Dolomite Sprint	145	33
11	B	45	Jubilee Motors Five Dock Pty Ltd	(Australia) Bill Brown (Australia) Sue Ransom	Ford Escort RS2000	144	34
12	B	36	B S Stillwell Ford & Co Pty Ltd	(Australia) Mike Stillwell (Australia) Geoff Brabham	Ford Escort RS2000	141	27
13	B	46	De Bortolis Wines Pty Ltd	(Australia) Bruce Hodgson (Australia) Dave Morrow	Ford Escort RS2000	140	37
14	A	58	Orange City Motors	(Australia) Peter Lander (Australia) Bob Martin	Morris Cooper S	140	45
15	A	68	Datsun Racing Team	(Australia) Bill Evans (Australia) Bruce Stewart	Datsun 1200	139	48
16	C	22	Rotary Rebuild	(Australia) Ray Harrison (Australia) Craig Bradtke	Mazda RX-3	139	18
17	C	28	B Benson	(Australia) Barry Seton (Australia) Don Smith	Ford Capri Mk.I GT 3000	138	17
18	A	65	Mini Bits	(Australia) Terry Wade (Australia) John Dellaca	Morris Cooper S	136	52
19	B	42	R Gulson	(Australia) Ray Gulson (Australia) Paul Gulson	Alfa Romeo 2000 GTV	135	30
20	D	4	Bob Forbes Automotive	(Australia) Bob Forbes (Australia) Wayne Negus	Holden LH Torana SL/R 5000 L34	135	9
21	B	35	Eurocars Pty Ltd	(Australia) David Clement (Australia) Brian Wheeler	Mazda RX-3	135	39
22	A	62	Fred's Treads Pty Ltd	(Australia) David Crowther (Australia) Gordon Rich	Alfa Romeo GT Junior	135	56
23	C	29	G Moran	(Australia) Geoff Moran (Australia) Eugene McLaoughlin	Ford Capri Mk.I GT 3000	134	50
24	A	69	James Mason Motors Pty Ltd	(Australia) Brian Porter (Australia) John Ainsley	Mazda 1300	132	59
25	D	20	K Kennedy	(Australia) Kevin Kennedy (Australia) Steve Land	Holden LJ Torana GTR XU-1	130	62
26	C	51	J Wharton	(Australia) John Wharton (Australia) Kerry Horgan	Mazda RX-3	129	41
27	A	59	Orange City Motors	(Australia) Caroline O'Shanesy (Australia) David Booth	Morris Cooper S	128	57
28	A	55	Alfa Romeo Owners Club of Aust.	(Australia) Robin Dudfield (Australia) Lance DeLuca	Alfa Romeo GT Junior	128	55
29	A	53	I Wells	(Australia) Ian Wells (Australia) Neil West	Honda Civic	127	51
30	A	60	Peter Mac's Towing Service Pty Ltd	(Australia) Geoff Wade (Australia) Robert Bride	Ford Escort GT1300	125	60
31	B	40	W D Electrics	(Australia) Warren Thompson (Australia) Rod Morris	Alfa Romeo 2000 GTV	119	36
32	B	49	Clemens Sporting Car Services Pty Ltd	(Australia) Mal Robertson (Australia) Frank Porter	Alfa Romeo 2000 GTV	119	28
33	C	10	Mazda House Racing Team	(Australia) Lakis Manticas (Australia) Mel Mollison	Mazda RX-3	116	22
34	B	39	G Morrell	(Australia) George Morrell (Australia) Alan Cant	Ford Escort Mk.I Twin Cam	113	38
DNF	D	17	Massey Holden	(New Zealand) Peter Janson (Australia) John Harvey	Holden LH Torana SL/R 5000 L34	143	12
DNF	B	26	Alfa Romeo Dealers Australia	(Australia) Tim Schenken (Australia) Paul Bernasconi	Alfa Romeo 2000 GTV	140	24
NC	D	19	American Express International Inc	(Australia) Graeme Adams (Australia) Bob Stevens	Holden LJ Torana GTR XU-1	118	61
DNF	A	56	Ray Molloy Motors Preston	(Australia) Ray Molloy (Australia) Alan Brazell	Morris Clubman GT	118	54
DNF	D	16	J Stoopman	(Australia) John Stoopman (Australia) Stuart Saker	Holden LJ Torana GTR XU-1	113	16
DNF	D	25	Allan Moffat Racing	(Canada) Allan Moffat (Australia) Ian Geoghegan	Ford XB Falcon GT Hardtop	109	2
DNF	C	30	West End Mazda	(Australia) Bernie Haehnle (Australia) Terry Finnigan	Mazda RX-3	97	21
NC	A	52	M McGinley	(Australia) Max McGinley (Australia) Paul King	Honda Civic	92	53
DNF	B	70	BMW Dealers NSW	(Australia) Peter Williamson (Australia) John McDonald	BMW 2002Tii	89	23
DNF	D	21	T Slako	(Australia) Tim Slako (Australia) Tony Wilkinson	Holden LH Torana SL/R 5000 L34	87	15
NC	A	57	Orange City Motors	(Australia) Gary Leggatt (Australia) David Seldon	Morris Cooper S	83	44
DNF	B	41	Brian Wood Ford	(Australia) Jim Murcott (Australia) Rod Stevens	Ford Escort RS2000	82	31
DNF	A	54	Lordco (Aust) Pty Ltd	(Australia) John Lord (Australia) John Harris	Morris Cooper S	75	46
DNF	D	9	Dusting of Burwood	(Australia) Rod McRae (Australia) Russ McRae	Holden LH Torana SL/R 5000 L34	67	13
DNF	C	23	Mazda Dealers Victoria	(Australia) Nick Louis (Australia) Ted Brewster	Mazda RX-3	64	32
DNF	A	67	C Heyer	(Australia) Chris Heyer (Australia) Barry Allen	Volkswagen Passat 1300	57	49
DNF	D	18	M Carter	(Australia) Murray Carter (Australia) Ray Winter	Ford XB Falcon GT Hardtop	53	7
DNF	A	64	Fred Williams Car Sales Pty Ltd	(Australia) Richard Stiegler (Australia) Greg Toepfer	Toyota Corolla	46	58
DNF	D	12	Craven Mild Racing	(Australia) Allan Grice (Australia) Jim Hunter	Holden LH Torana SL/R 5000 L34	41	6
DNF	C	31	G Newton	(Australia) Geoff Newton (Australia) Paul Feltham	Ford Capri Mk.I GT 3000	41	43
DNF	C	66	Hobson White Motors Pty Ltd	(Australia) Tom Naughton (Australia) Ross Wemyss	Mercedes-Benz 280E	23	47
DNF	D	14	C O'Brien	(Australia) Charlie O'Brien (Australia) Graham Ryan	Holden LH Torana SL/R 5000 L34	22	11
DNF	C	32	HM Headers	(Australia) Lawrie Nelson (Australia) Bob Watson	Ford Capri Mk.I GT 3000	16	35
DNF	B	8	Alfa Romeo Dealers Australia	(United Kingdom) John Fitzpatrick (Australia) Fred Gibson	Alfa Romeo 2000 GTV	12	26
DNF	D	1	John Goss Racing Pty Ltd	(Australia) John Goss (Australia) Kevin Bartlett	Ford XB Falcon GT Hardtop	10	10
DNF	B	13	Bob Holden - Shell Racing	(Australia) Bob Holden (Australia) Lyndon Arnel	Ford Escort RS2000	3	40
DNF	C	33	John Roxburgh Motors Pty. Ltd.	(Australia) Doug Whiteford (Australia) Geoff Perry	Datsun 260Z 2+2	3	42
DSQ	C	24	James Mason Motors Pty Ltd	(Australia) Lynn Brown (Australia) Ron Gillard	Mazda RX-3	149	25

== Statistics ==
- Pole Position - #2 Colin Bond - 2:27.4
- Fastest Lap - N/A
- Average Speed - 140 km/h
- Race Time - 7:10:11.3
