= 1969 Hardie-Ferodo 500 =

Motor race in Australia

Seasons
- ← 1968 1970 →

Layout of the Mount Panorama Circuit (1938-1986)

The 1969 Hardie-Ferodo 500 was the tenth running of the Bathurst 500 production car race. It was held on 5 October 1969 at the Mount Panorama Circuit just outside Bathurst in New South Wales, Australia. Cars competed in five classes based on the purchase price in Australian dollars of the vehicle.

The race was dominated by the newly formed Holden Dealer Team fielding three Holden Monaro GTS350s, with Colin Bond and Tony Roberts taking the chequered flag; teammates Peter Brock and Des West finished third and the team's third car finished sixth. In second position were the previous year’s race winners Bruce McPhee and his single-lap co-driver Barry Mulholland, driving a Ford Falcon GTHO. McPhee and Mulholland, who had won the 1968 race driving a Holden Monaro GTS327, had originally intended to race a Monaro 350 in 1969 but after receiving no help from Holden, instead decided to race one of the new Falcons.

Brock and Melbourne based Canadian Allan Moffat made their Bathurst débuts in the race; Brock with Harry Firth's Holden Dealer Team, and Moffat driving a works Falcon GTHO with Alan Hamilton. Between them, Brock and Moffat would go on to win 13 of the next 17 Bathurst 500/1000s (until 1987), with Brock winning a record nine times (all for Holden), and Moffat winning four times for Ford.

The Ford Works Team were the favourites to win the race with their new Falcon GTHOs, which with their new 5.8-litre (351 cui "Windsor") V8 engines proved to have a speed advantage over the 5.7-litre (350 cui) Monaros. However, the decision by Ford Works Team's American manager Al Turner to import special racing tyres for the Falcons proved to be a disaster. During the race numerous tyre failures put the Works cars out of contention. After early tyre failures on the Ian (more commonly known as "Pete") and Leo Geoghegan car, as well as the Fred Gibson and Barry Seton car, Turner called Moffat into the pits for a tyre change. There Moffat cemented his status as not only a top driver, but one who could take care of his car when it was found that unlike his team mates Pete Geoghegan and Seton, Moffat had been far easier on his tyres and that the stop was not actually necessary. As of 2025, Moffat believes that this decision cost himself and co-driver Alan Hamilton the race win. The day after the race, Ford ran a full page newspaper advert stating "We were a little deflated" referring to the tyre failures.

The 1969 race was also notable for the first-lap crash which saw at least one third of the field forced to retire or continue with accident damage. Bill Brown rolled his Falcon GTHO coming through Skyline, all but blocking the track while John French, who qualified 21st, rolled his Alfa Romeo 1750 GTV trying to avoid the carnage that Brown's rollover caused. One driver lucky to escape the carnage was Allan Moffat, who had pulled up just out of The Cutting on the first lap with his Falcon stuck in neutral. Once he got going he was able to weave through the stopped vehicles and debris at Skyline and continue on his way. For Brown, it would be the first of three rollovers in three years at Bathurst on the same piece of road (McPhillamy Park - Skyline), with the third and last in 1971 bringing a lucky escape from death for himself and a pair of quick-reacting and fleet-footed flag marshals who only just managed to scamper out of the way.

== Class structure ==
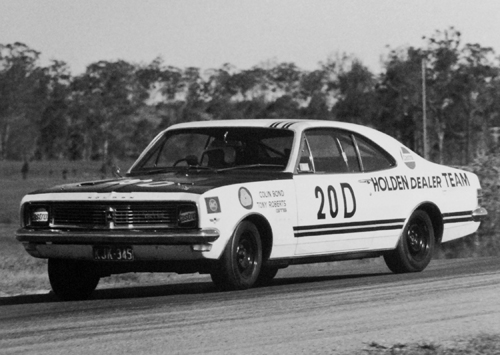
The winning Holden Monaro GTS350 (pictured at Lakeside in July 1970)

Cars competed in five classes based on the purchase price (in Australian dollars) of the vehicle.

=== Class A ===
Class A was for cars which retailed for up to $1,860. It was made up of Datsun 1000s, a Hillman GT, Morris Mini Ks and Toyota Corollas.

=== Class B ===
Class B was for cars which retailed for $1,861 to $2,250. More than half of the class’ cars were Datsun 1600s, but a Ford Cortina, Hillman Gazelle, Morris 1500, Renault 10 and Volkswagen 1600 were also entered.

=== Class C ===
The $2,251 to $3,100 Class C saw a mix of a Chrysler Valiant, Fiat 125s, Ford Capris, Mazda R100s, Morris Cooper Ss and a Renault 16.

=== Class D ===
The $3,101 to $4,500 class featured the outright contenders, Ford Falcon GTHOs and Holden Monaros (with twice as many Falcons as Monaros), but also contained a single Toyota Corona 1900.

=== Class E ===
For cars over $4,500, this class had a single automatic gearbox version of the Ford Falcon GT but otherwise was all Alfa Romeo, with 1750 GTVs and a 1750 Berlina.

== Top 10 Qualifiers ==
Pos	No	Entrant	Drivers	Car	Qual
Pole	59	Ford Australia	(Australia) Ian Geoghegan	Ford XW Falcon GTHO	2:48.9
2	51	Fair Deal Car Sales	(Australia) Digby Cooke	Holden HT Monaro GTS350	2:50.0
3	46	Kloster Pty Ltd	(Australia) Bruce McPhee	Ford XW Falcon GTHO	2:50.1
4	61	Ford Australia	(Canada) Allan Moffat	Ford XW Falcon GTHO	2:53.6
5	60	Ford Australia	(Australia) Fred Gibson	Ford XW Falcon GTHO	2:53.7
6	56	Alto-Ford Pty Ltd	(Australia) David McKay	Ford XW Falcon GTHO	2:53.7
7	44	Holden Dealer Team	(Australia) Colin Bond	Holden HT Monaro GTS350	2:53.8
8	42	Holden Dealer Team	(Australia) Peter Macrow	Holden HT Monaro GTS350	2:54.5
9	50	McLeod Ford	(Australia) John Goss	Ford XW Falcon GTHO	2:55.3
10	43	Holden Dealer Team	(Australia) Des West	Holden HT Monaro GTS350	2:55.4

== Results ==
Pos	Class	No	Entrant	Drivers	Car	Laps	Qual Pos
1	D	44	Holden Dealer Team	(Australia) Colin Bond (Australia) Tony Roberts	Holden HT Monaro GTS350	130	7
2	D	46	Kloster Pty Ltd	(Australia) Bruce McPhee (Australia) Barry Mulholland	Ford XW Falcon GTHO	130	2
3	D	43	Holden Dealer Team	(Australia) Peter Brock (Australia) Des West	Holden HT Monaro GTS350	130	10
4	D	61	Ford Australia	(Canada) Allan Moffat (Australia) Alan Hamilton	Ford XW Falcon GTHO	129	4
5	D	59	Ford Australia	(Australia) Ian Geoghegan (Australia) Leo Geoghegan	Ford XW Falcon GTHO	128	1
6	D	42	Holden Dealer Team	(Australia) Peter Macrow (Australia) Henk Woelders	Holden HT Monaro GTS350	128	8
7	D	54	Wright Ford Motors Pty Ltd	(Australia) Bob Beasley (Australia) Bob Muir	Ford XW Falcon GTHO	127	18
8	E	71	Alec Mildren Alfa Romeo	(Australia) Kevin Bartlett (Australia) Len Goodwin	Alfa Romeo 1750 GTV	126	22
9	E	68	C Smith	(Australia) Charlie Smith (Australia) Bill Ford	Ford XW Falcon GT Automatic	126	20
10	D	58	Byrt Ford	(Australia) Martin Chenery (Australia) Ernie Johnson	Ford XW Falcon GTHO	125	19
11	E	69	Canberra Speed Shop	(Australia) Peter Brown (Australia) Ray Gulson	Alfa Romeo 1750 Berlina	122	27
12	D	63	R Genders	(Australia) Joe Butta (Australia) Bob Genders	Ford XW Falcon GTHO	122	24
13	D	48	Rowell Thiele Ford Pty Ltd	(Australia) Mike Savva (Australia) Bob Wilkinson	Ford XW Falcon GTHO	121	11
14	C	30	Waterloo High Performance Tuning Centre	(Australia) Ron Gillard (Australia) Warren Gracie	Morris Cooper S	119	36
15	C	38	Grenville Motors P/L	(Australia) Peter Finlay (Australia) Bob Forbes	Fiat 125	119	34
16	C	31	Zanardo & Rodriguez Sales & Service	(Australia) Ron Kearns (Australia) Gerry Lister	Fiat 125	119	37
17	C	22	Graham Ryan Auto Repairs	(Australia) Graham Ryan (Australia) Mike Kable	Chrysler Valiant Pacer	118	30
18	B	18	W.H. Motors	(Australia) Bruce Stewart (Australia) George Garth	Datsun 1600	117	41
19	C	25	G Cooke	(Australia) Gary Cooke (Australia) Geoff Spence	Mazda R100	117	35
20	C	32	Marque Motors	(Australia) Ian Hindmarsh (Australia) Bill Stanley	Morris Cooper S	117	33
21	C	23	Trevor Mason Developments	(Australia) Trevor Mason (Australia) Neil Mason	Mazda R100	117	32
22	C	26	Regal Motors Pty Ltd	(Australia) Les Grose (Australia) Graham Moore	Morris Cooper S	117	45
23	B	15	Datsun Racing Team	(Australia) John Roxburgh (Australia) Doug Whiteford	Datsun 1600	117	44
24	B	17	W.H. Motors	(Australia) Don Smith (Australia) Peter Wilson	Datsun 1600	114	43
25	B	19	McInnes Automotive Conversions	(Australia) Dave Morrow (Australia) Bob Wootton	Datsun 1600	114	51
26	D	57	P Bradford	(Australia) Roy Griffiths (Australia) Glyn Scott	Ford XW Falcon GTHO	114	17
27	B	14	Datsun Racing Team	(Australia) William Coad (Australia) Jon Leighton	Datsun 1600	113	46
28	C	28	D Frazer	(Australia) David Frazer (Australia) Allan Johns	Morris Cooper S	113	42
29	A	2	AMI Toyota	(Australia) Brian Sampson (Australia) Bob Morris	Toyota Corolla	112	52
30	A	6	Datsun Racing Team	(Australia) Bill Evans (Australia) Barry Tapsall	Datsun 1000	110	55
31	B	20	McLeod Ford Pty Ltd	(Australia) Max Dickson (Australia) Diane Dickson	Ford Cortina Mk.II 240	108	57
32	B	10	Provincial Motors Pty Ltd	(Australia) Gary Campbell (Australia) Gerry Murphy	Volkswagen 1600	107	58
33	C	27	President Car Sales	(Australia) Bill Bryden (Australia) John T. Smith	Renault 16TS	107	53
34	A	7	Kent BMC	(Australia) David Bye (Australia) Richard Willis	Morris Mini K	104	61
35	B	9	R Edgerton	(Australia) Bob Edgerton (Australia) Ross Edgerton	Renault 10	100	62
36	A	8	P & R Williams	(Australia) Arthur Olsen (Australia) Sandra Bennett	Morris Mini K	99	63
37	B	12	R. G. Lanyon	(Australia) Alf Barrett (Australia) Mel Mollison	Morris 1500	97	56
38	D	52	Harry Gapps Ford Pty Ltd	(Australia) Harry Gapps (Australia) Frank Hann	Ford XW Falcon GTHO	94	23
39	A	4	C.J. Cronin	(Australia) Martin Cortese (Australia) Steve Parkes	Toyota Corolla	93	60
40	C	35	T Meehan	(Australia) Trevor Meehan (Australia) Mal Brewster	Morris Cooper S	93	39
41	B	16	M.T.R. Services	(Australia) Nick Ledingham (Australia) Damon Beck	Hillman Gazelle	84	49
42	C	36	E.M. Automation Pty Ltd	(Australia) Paul Mander (Australia) Phil Edwards	Morris Cooper S	82	29
DNF	D	51	Fair Deal Car Sales	(Australia) Digby Cooke (Australia) David Bowden	Holden HT Monaro GTS350	96	2
DNF	D	60	Ford Australia	(Australia) Fred Gibson (Australia) Barry Seton	Ford XW Falcon GTHO	93	5
DNF	C	24	K Grose	(Australia) Keith Grose (Australia) John Wright	Ford Capri Mk.I 1600GT	92	38
DNF	A	1	A Johns	(Australia) George Geshopulos (Australia) Ray Scanlan	Hillman GT	88	59
DNF	C	37	Grand Prix Auto Services	(Australia) Ann Thomson (Australia) Carole Corness	Morris Cooper S	82	47
DNF	D	56	Alto-Ford Pty Ltd	(Australia) David McKay (Australia) Brian Foley	Ford XW Falcon GTHO	78	6
DNF	D	45	AMI Toyota	(Australia) Max Stewart (Australia) Brian Reed	Toyota Corona 1900SL	78	28
DNF	B	21	M.T.R. Services	(Australia) Hans Tholstrup (Australia) Brian Connell	Datsun 1600	73	64
DNF	D	50	McLeod Ford Pty Ltd	(Australia) John Goss (Australia) Denis Cribbin	Ford XW Falcon GTHO	50	9
DNF	C	33	Brian Foley Motors Pty Ltd	(Australia) Christine Gibson (Australia) Lynne Keefe	Fiat 125	48	40
DNF	D	62	Anthony Horden & Sons Ltd	(Australia) Nick Petrilli (Australia) Max Stahl	Holden HT Monaro GTS350	45	15
DNF	D	64	Boyded of Bankstown	(Australia) Bill Tuckey (Australia) Sib Petralia	Holden HT Monaro GTS350	44	13
DNF	D	53	B Arentz	(Australia) Barry Arentz (Australia) Brian Michelmore	Ford XW Falcon GTHO	36	12
DNF	C	39	D.H. Whitehead	(Australia) Bernie Haehnle (Australia) Peter Wherrett	Mazda R100	31	31
DNF	B	11	Dependable Motor Sales Pty Ltd	(Australia) Bruce Darke (Australia) Dennis Cooke	Datsun 1600	4	50
DNF	C	29	Central Motors Penrith P/L	(Australia) Bob Cook (Australia) Alan Cant	Ford Capri Mk.I 1600GT	1	48
DNF	D	55	Alto-Ford Pty Ltd	(Australia) Bill Brown (Australia) Phil West	Ford XW Falcon GTHO	0	16
DNF	E	72	Alec Mildren Alfa Romeo	(Australia) John French (Australia) Doug Chivas	Alfa Romeo 1750 GTV	0	21
DNF	E	67	Bryan Thomson Motors	(Australia) Bryan Thomson (Australia) Graham Ritter	Alfa Romeo 1750 GTV	0	25
DNF	C	34	Varsity Auto Centre	(Australia) John Prisk (Australia) Alan Cameron	Morris Cooper S	0	27
DSQ	A	3	AMI Toyota	(Australia) Barry Ferguson (Australia) Jim Laing-Peach	Toyota Corolla	103	54
DNS	D	49	Young & Green Pty. Ltd.	(Australia) David Sheldon (Australia) Don Holland	Holden HT Monaro GTS350		15
DNS	C	40	Teterin Engineering Pty. Ltd.	(Australia) R. Marquet (Australia) J. Andrews	Morris Cooper S		
DNS	A	5	Datsun Racing Team	(Australia) Bob Holden (Australia) Don Toffolon	Datsun 1000		

== Statistics ==
- Pole Position - #59 Ian Geoghegan - 2:48.9
- Fastest Lap - #61 Moffat/Hamilton & #60 Gibson/Seton - 2:52.1 (lap record)
- Race time of winning car: 6:32:25
- Fastest Flying 1/8 : Bruce McPhee & Barry Mulholland (Ford Falcon GTHO): 135.95 mph
