= 1972 Sandown 250 =

The 1972 Sandown 250 was an endurance motor race for Group E Series Production Touring Cars. It was held on 10 September 1972 over 130 laps of the Sandown circuit in Victoria, Australia, a total distance of 250 miles (403 km). The race was Heat 2 of the 1972 Australian Manufacturers' Championship.

The race was won by John Goss driving a Ford XY Falcon GTHO Phase III.

== Class Structure ==
As a heat of the 1972 Australian Manufacturers' Championship, the race featured four classes defined by "Capacity Price Units". The CP Unit value for each car was assessed by multiplying the engine capacity (in litres) by the Sydney retail price (in Australian dollars).

- Class A : Up to 3,000 CP Units
- Class B : 3,001 to 9,000 CP Units
- Class C : 9,001 to 18,000 CP Units
- Class D : Over 18,000 CP Units

== Results ==
Position	Drivers	No.	Car	Entrant	Laps
1	John Goss	12	Ford XY Falcon GTHO Phase III	McLeod Ford	130
2	Fred Gibson	8	Ford XY Falcon GTHO Phase III	Ford Motor Company of Australia Ltd.	130
3	Murray Carter	3	Ford XY Falcon GTHO Phase III	Murray Carter	126
4	Tony Niovanni	35	Holden LJ Torana GTR XU-1	Peter Robinson Motors	125
5	Stewart McLeod	36	Holden LJ Torana GTR XU-1	Stewart McLeod	124
6	Bruce McPhee	31	Holden LJ Torana GTR XU-1	Ron Hodgson Motors	123
7	Graeme Blanchard, Dennis Gallagher	29	Holden LJ Torana GTR XU-1	Blanchard Motors Pty. Ltd.	122
8	John Stoopman	26	Holden LC Torana GTR XU-1	John Stoopman	122
9	Paul Gulson	10	Ford XY Falcon GTHO Phase III	Paul Gulson	121
10	Lyndon Arnel	54	Ford Escort Twin Cam	Lyndon Arnel	119
	Class A : Up to 3,000 CP Units				
1	Geoff Perry	67	Mazda 1300	Bainbridge Motors	109
2	Mel Mollison, Tony Farrell	64	Mazda 1300	Bainbridge Motors	108
3	Jon Leighton	63	Datsun 1200	Datsun Racing Team	107
4	James Laing-Peach	73	Datsun 1200	Datsun Racing Team	
?	Sutherland, Garry Keen	74	Mazda 1300	Victoria Police Motor Sports Club	
DNF	Roger Bonhomme	66	Chrysler Valiant Galant	Collins Chrysler	
DNF	Gary Cook	62	Mazda 1300	Mazda Dealer Team	
	Class B : 3,001 to 9,000 CP Units				
1	Lyndon Arnel	54	Ford Escort Twin Cam	Lyndon Arnel	119
2	John Piper	39	Ford Escort Twin Cam	Evans Motor Service	118
3	Bob Holden	52	Ford Escort GT1600	R. J. Holdenn	118
?	Lakis Manticas	38	Ford Escort Twin Cam	Sideways Car Roofs	
?	Jim Murcott	40	Ford Escort Twin Cam	Brian Wood Ford	
DNF	Bill Gates	41	Ford Escort Twin Cam	Morley Ford	
DISQ	Wayne Rogerson, George Garth	37	Mazda Capella	Mazda Dealer Team	
	Class C : 9,001 to 18,000 CP Units				
1	Tony Niovanni	35	Holden LJ Torana GTR XU-1	Peter Robinson Motors	125
2	Stewart McLeod	36	Holden LJ Torana GTR XU-1	S. McLeod	124
3	Bruce McPhee	31	Holden LJ Torana GTR XU-1	Ron Hodgson Motors	123
4	Graeme Blanchard, Dennis Gallagher	29	Holden LJ Torana GTR XU-1	Blanchard Motors Pty. Ltd.	122
5	John Stoopman	26	Holden LC Torana GTR XU-1	J. Stoopman	122
?	Rod McRae	22	Holden LJ Torana GTR XU-1	Dustings of Burwood Pty. Ltd.	
DNF	Frank Porter	23	Holden LJ Torana GTR XU-1	Garry & Waren Smith Pty. Ltd.	
DNF	Colin Bond	24	Holden LJ Torana GTR XU-1	Holden Dealer Team	
DNF	Peter Brock	28	Holden LJ Torana GTR XU-1	Holden Dealer Team	100
DNF	Paul Beranger	34	Holden LJ Torana GTR XU-1	Truform Engine Reconditioning	
DNF	Karen McPherson	27	Holden LJ Torana GTR XU-1	Karen McPherson	16
DNF	Bruce Stewart		Holden LJ Torana GTR XU-1		
	Class D : Over 18,000 CP Units				
1	John Goss	12	Ford XY Falcon GTHO Phase III	McLeod Ford	130
2	Fred Gibson	8	Ford XY Falcon GTHO Phase III	Ford Motor Company of Australia Ltd.	130
3	Murray Carter	3	Ford XY Falcon GTHO Phase III	Murray Carter	126
4	Paul Gulson	10	Ford XY Falcon GTHO Phase III	Paul Gulson	121
NC	Tom Naughton	4	Chrysler VH Valiant Charger	Eastside Chrysler	
DNF	John French	5	Ford XY Falcon GTHO Phase III	Brian Byrt Ford Pty. Ltd.	92
DNF	Pete Dowling, Brian Ovenden	20	Chrysler VH Valiant Charger	MPWD Racing Team	
DNF	Lawrie Nelson	14	Chrysler VH Valiant Charger	Tony Roberts Automotive Centre	
DNF	Allan Moffat	1	Ford XY Falcon GTHO Phase III	Ford Motor Company of Australia Ltd.	11
DNF	Trevor Meehan	16	Ford XY Falcon GTHO Phase III	Gypsie Carpets Pty. Ltd.	7

Note: Of the 43 starters, 22 were classified as finishers and 2 completed insufficient laps to be classified. The above table does not show all starters.

Preceded by 1971 Sandown 250	Sandown 250; 1972	Succeeded by 1973 Sandown 250
