= 1972 Australian Manufacturers' Championship =

The 1972 Australian Manufacturers' Championship was an Australian motor racing competition for car manufacturers. Contested over a five-round series, it was the sanctioned by the Confederation of Australian Motor Sport as the second Australian Manufacturers' Championship.

The championship was won by Ford.

== Schedule ==
Round	Race title	Circuit	State	Date	Winning driver(s)	Winning car	Report
1	Chesterfield 250	Adelaide International Raceway	South Australia	27 August	(Australia) Colin Bond	Holden Torana LJ GTR XU1	Report
2	Sandown 250	Sandown Park	Victoria	10 September	(Australia) John Goss	Ford XY Falcon GTHO Phase III	Report
3	Hardie-Ferodo 500	Mount Panorama, Bathurst	New South Wales	1 October	(Australia) Peter Brock	Holden Torana LJ GTR XU1	Report
4	Phillip Island 500K	Phillip Island	Victoria	21 October	(Canada) Allan Moffat	Ford XY Falcon GTHO Phase III	Report
5	Chesterfield 300	Surfers Paradise	Queensland	26 November	(Canada) Allan Moffat	Ford XY Falcon GTHO Phase III	Report

All rounds were open only to Group E Series Production Touring Cars.

== Classes ==
Entries were divided into four classes, defined via "CP Units", where the engine capacity of the vehicle (in litres) was multiplied by the retail price of the vehicle (in dollars) to give a CP (Capacity Price) Units value for each model.

- Class A : Up to 3,000 CP Units
- Class B : 3,001 to 9,000 CP Units
- Class C : 9,001 to 18,000 CP Units
- Class D: 18,001 CP Units and over

== Points system ==
For each round other than the Bathurst round, championship points were awarded 9,8,7,6,5,4,3,2,1 in each class with bonus points awarded for outright placings on a 4,3,2,1 basis.

For the Bathurst round, points were awarded 18,16,14,12,10,8,6,4,2 in each class with bonus points awarded for outright placings on a 4,3,2,1 basis.

== Championship standings ==
Championship standings were as follows:

Position	Manufacturer	Class	Car	Ade.	San.	Bat.	Phi.	Sur.	Points
1	Ford	D	Ford Falcon XY GTHO	10	13	21	13	13	70
2	Holden	C	Holden Torana LJ GTR XU-1	13	10	22	12	12	69
3	Ford	B	Ford Escort Twin Cam & Ford Escort GT1600	9	9	18	9	9	54
4	Mazda	A	Mazda 1300	9	9	16	9	9	52
=5	Chrysler	D	Chrysler Valiant Charger R/T E49	8	-	18	7	6	39
=5	Datsun	A	Datsun 1200	8	7	18	?	?	39
7	Mazda	B	Mazda Capella RE	-	?	16	?	?	29
8	Alfa Romeo	C	Alfa Romeo 1750 GTV	5	?	10	?	?	18
9	Chrysler	C	Chrysler Valiant Charger R/T E38	-	-	12	-	-	12
10	Fiat	B	Fiat 124 Sport	-	-	6	-	-	6
=11	Chrysler	A	Chrysler Valiant Galant	5	-	-	-	-	5
=11	Morris	B	Morris Cooper S	-	?	-	?	?	5
13	Holden	B	Holden Torana LC GTR	-	-	2	-	-	2
