= 1972 Australian Touring Car Championship =

Motor racing competition

Seasons
- ← 1971 1973 →

The 1972 Australian Touring Car Championship was a CAMS sanctioned national motor racing title open to Group C Improved Production Touring Cars and Group E Series Production Touring Cars. The championship, which was the 13th running of the Australian Touring Car Championship, began at Symmons Plains and ended at Oran Park after eight rounds.

1972 would be the final time the Improved Production cars would contest the ATCC. From 1973, CAMS introduced a new production based Group C touring car formula. Outright cars like the Ford Mustangs, Chevrolet Camaros, Norm Beechey's Holden Monaro and Ian Geoghegan's Ford XY Falcon GTHO Phase III would be replaced with production based Ford Falcons and Holden Toranas. Many Improved Production cars would end up racing as Sports Sedans in the following years.

Defending champion Bob Jane won his fourth and final Australian Touring Car Championship in his Chevrolet Camaro ZL-1. Unlike 1971 when Jane's Camaro used the 7.0 litre 427 V8 engine, CAMS rule changes reducing the engine capacity limit to 6000cc him forced to run the 5.7 litre 350 V8. Second in the championship was the Ford Escort Twin Cam Mk.1 of Mike Stillwell whose consistent placings in the under 2.0 litre class saw him finish 11 points behind Jane. Third was Allan Moffat in his Ford Boss 302 Mustang.

Although he was not classified after not scoring a point, the 1972 championship saw Peter Brock make his ATCC debut driving a Holden LJ Torana GTR XU-1 for Harry Firth's Holden Dealer Team.

== Teams and drivers ==
The following drivers competed in the 1972 Australian Touring Car Championship.

Driver	No	Car	Entrant
(Australia) Ian Geoghegan	1 & 10	Ford XY Falcon GTHO Phase III	Geoghegan's Sporty Cars
(Australia) Fred Gibson	1	Ford XY Falcon GTHO Phase III	Road & Track Auto Services
(Australia) Jim McKeown	2 & 3	Alfa Romeo 2000 GTV	Shell Racing Team
(Australia) Kingsley Hibbard	2	Ford XY Falcon GTHO Phase III	Kingsley Hibbard
(Australia) Clive Green	4	Ford Mustang	Shell Racing
(Australia) John French	4	Ford XY Falcon GTHO Phase III	Bryan Byrt Ford
(Australia) John Goss	5	Ford XY Falcon GTHO Phase III	McLeod Ford
(Australia) Graham Blanchard	5	Chevrolet Camaro	Blanchard Motors
(Australia) Mike Stillwell	5 & 6	Ford Escort Twin Cam Mk.I	BS Stillwell Ford
(Australia) John Harvey	7	Holden HQ Monaro GTS350	Bob Jane Racing
(Australia) Mel McEwin	8	Toyota Corolla Sprinter	Mel McEwin
(Canada) Allan Moffat	9	Ford Boss 302 Mustang	Allan Moffat Racing
(Australia) Dick Johnson	10	Holden LJ Torana GTR XU-1	Dick Johnson
(Australia) Peter Brown	11	Alfa Romeo 2000 GTV	Alfa Romeo Australia
(Australia) Don Holland	13	Holden LJ Torana GTR XU-1	Max Wright Motors Pty Ltd
(Australia) Bob Holden	13 & 113	Ford Escort Twin Cam Mk.I	Dr. Allan Hogan
(Australia) Malcolm Ramsay	14	Holden HQ Kingswood	5AD City State Racing Team
(Australia) Clem Smith	15	Chrysler VH Valiant Charger	Clem Smith
(Australia) Norm Watts	15	Ford Capri V6	Motor Improvements
(Australia) Arnold Ahrenfield	16	Holden LJ Torana GTR XU-1	Arnold Ahrenfield
(Australia) Graham Ryan	17	Chrysler VH Valiant Charger	Graham Ryan
(Australia) Ted Brewster	19	Holden LJ Torana GTR XU-1	BP Southmark
(Australia) John Stoopman	19	Holden LJ Torana GTR XU-1	John Stoopman
(Australia) John Rushford	24	Ford Escort Twin Cam Mk.I	Rushford Engineering Co
(Australia) Doug Chivas	29	Chrysler VH Valiant Charger	Liverpool Chrysler
(Australia) Phil Brock	32	Chrysler VH Valiant Charger	Eastside Chrysler
(Australia) Tom Naughton	33	Chrysler VH Valiant Charger	Eastside Chrysler
(Australia) Tim Smith	34	Holden LJ Torana GTR XU-1	TS Smith
(Australia) Colin Bond	34	Holden LJ Torana GTR XU-1	Holden Dealer Team
(Australia) Tony Allen	35	Chrysler VH Valiant Charger	Tony Allen
(Australia) Norm Beechey	40	Holden HT Monaro GTS350	Shell / Norm Beechey Racing
(Australia) Lyndon Arnel	43	Ford Escort Twin Cam Mk.I	Tony Motson's Performance Tuning
(Australia) Mike Gore	45	Ford Mustang	Mike Gore
(Australia) Bob Connolly	59	Morris Cooper S	RA Connolly
(Australia) Frank Porter	59	Holden LJ Torana GTR XU-1	Frank Porter
(Australia) Tony Watts	64	Morris Cooper S	Richard Locke Motor Engineering
(Australia) Henry Price	69	Morris Clubman GT	Grand Prix Auto Service
(Australia) Alan Braszell	71	Morris Cooper S	Alray Motors
(Australia) Keith Henry	71	Ford Escort Twin Cam Mk.I	Keith Henry
(Australia) George Giesberts	72	Holden LJ Torana GTR XU-1	Leach Motors
(Australia) Bob Jane	76	Chevrolet Camaro ZL-1	Bob Jane Racing
(Australia) Herb Taylor	77	Holden EH	Herb Taylor
(Australia) John Martin	85	Holden LJ Torana GTR XU-1	John Martin
(Australia) Lawrie Nelson	88	Chrysler VH Valiant Charger	Lawrie Nelson
(Australia) Robin Bessant	90	Ford Mustang	Shell Racing
(Australia) Norm Gown	99	Holden EH	Norm Gown

Two litre class competitors

== Calendar ==
The 1972 Australian Touring Car Championship was contested over an eight-round series with one race per round.

Rd.	Race title	Circuit	City / state	Date	Winner	Team
1	(Australia) Symmons Plains	Symmons Plains Raceway	Launceston, Tasmania	6 March	Allan Moffat	Allan Moffat Racing
2	(Australia) Calder	Calder Park Raceway	Melbourne, Victoria	19 March	Bob Jane	Bob Jane Racing
3	(Australia) Better Brakes 100	Mount Panorama Circuit	Bathurst, New South Wales	3 April	Ian Geoghegan	Geoghegan's Sporty Cars
4	(Australia) Sandown	Sandown International Raceway	Melbourne, Victoria	16 April	Allan Moffat	Allan Moffat Racing
5	(Australia) Adelaide	Adelaide International Raceway	Adelaide, South Australia	11 June	Bob Jane	Bob Jane Racing
6	(Australia) Warwick Farm	Warwick Farm Raceway	Sydney, New South Wales	9 July	Bob Jane	Bob Jane Racing
7	(Australia) Surfers Paradise	Surfers Paradise International Raceway	Surfers Paradise, Queensland	22 July	Bob Jane	Bob Jane Racing
8	(Australia) Oran Park	Oran Park Raceway	Sydney, New South Wales	6 August	Allan Moffat	Allan Moffat Racing

== Classes ==
Cars competed in two engine capacity classes:

- Up to and including 2000cc
- Over 2000cc

== Points system ==
Championship points were awarded on a 9-6-4-3-2-1 basis for the first six placings in each class at each round. In addition, points were awarded on a 4-3-2-1 basis for the first four outright placings, irrespective of class, at each round. The title was awarded to the driver gaining the highest total of points in any seven of the eight rounds.

== Championship standings ==
Pos	Driver	Car	Sym.	Cal.	Bat.	San.	Ade.	War.	Sur.	Ora.	Pts
1	Bob Jane	Chevrolet Camaro ZL-1	2nd(9)	1st(13)	Ret	2nd(9)	1st(13)	1st(13)	1st(13)	3rd(6)	76
2	Mike Stillwell	Ford Escort Twin Cam Mk.I	5th(9)	6th(9)	6th(9)	7th(9)	6th(9)	4th(10)	4th(10)		65
3	Allan Moffat	Ford Boss 302 Mustang	1st(13)	Ret	2nd(9)	1st(13)	4th(4)	DSQ	10th(1)	1st(13)	53
4	Ian Geoghegan	Ford XY Falcon GTHO Phase III	Ret	3rd(6)	1st(13)	Ret	2nd(9)	DNS	Ret	2nd(9)	37
4	Bob Holden	Ford Escort Twin Cam Mk.I	Ret	7th(6)	(4)	9th(6)	7th(6)	7th(6)	Ret	9th(9)	37
6	Malcolm Ramsay	Holden HQ Kingswood	3rd(6)	2nd(9)		Ret	3rd(6)	2nd(9)	DNS	Ret	30
7	Dick Johnson	Holden LJ Torana GTR XU-1						3rd(6)	3rd(6)	4th(4)	16
8	Peter Brown	Alfa Romeo 2000 GTV			(3)	(4)	8th(4)		8th(4)		15
9	John Harvey	Holden HQ Monaro GTS350							2nd(9)	Ret	9
9	Alan Braszell	Morris Cooper S		10th(4)		(3)	(2)				9
11	John Goss	Ford XY Falcon GTHO Phase III			3rd(6)					5th(2)	8
11	Robin Bessant	Ford Mustang	4th(4)	4th(4)							8
13	Norm Beechey	Holden HT Monaro GTS350	Ret	Ret	Ret	3rd(6)	DNS		DNS		6
13	Bob Connolly	Morris Cooper S	7th(6)								6
13	Jim McKeown	Alfa Romeo 2000 GTV		DNS	7th(6)	Ret					6
13	Henry Price	Morris Clubman GT							7th(6)		6
17	Fred Gibson	Ford XY Falcon GTHO Phase III			4th(4)						4
17	Kingsley Hibbard	Ford XY Falcon GTHO Phase III				4th(4)					4
17	Clive Green	Ford Mustang		5th(2)		5th(2)					4
17	Don Holland	Holden LJ Torana GTR XU-1						5th(3)		6th(1)	4
17	Tony Watts	Morris Cooper S	8th(4)								4
22	John French	Ford XY Falcon GTHO Phase III							5th(3)		3
22	John Rushford	Ford Escort Twin Cam Mk.I	9th(3)								3
22	Mel McEwin	Toyota Corolla Sprinter					10th(3)				3
22	Lyndon Arnel	Ford Escort Twin Cam Mk.I							9th(3)		3
26	Doug Chivas	Chrysler VH Valiant Charger			5th(2)						2
26	Graham Blanchard	Chevrolet Camaro					5th(2)				2
26	Tim Smith	Holden LJ Torana GTR XU-1	6th(2)								2
26	Colin Bond	Holden LJ Torana GTR XU-1			10th			6th(2)			2
26	George Giesberts	Holden LJ Torana GTR XU-1							6th(2)		2
26	Keith Henry	Ford Escort Twin Cam Mk.I							(2)		2
32	Ted Brewster	Holden LJ Torana GTR XU-1				6th(1)					1
32	Tom Naughton	Chrysler VH Valiant Charger		8th(1)	9th						1
32	Phil Brock	Chrysler VH Valiant Charger		9th	8th(1)						1
32	Graham Ryan	Chrysler VH Valiant Charger						8th(1)			1
32	Clem Smith	Chrysler VH Valiant Charger					9th(1)				1
-	Norm Watts	Ford Capri V6						10th (-)			0
Pos	Driver	Car	Sym.	Cal.	Bat.	San.	Ade.	War.	Sur.	Ora.	Pts

Colour	Result
Gold	Winner
Silver	Second place
Bronze	Third place
Green	Points classification
Blue	Non-points classification
Blue	Non-classified finish (NC)
Purple	Retired, not classified (Ret)
Red	Did not qualify (DNQ)
Red	Did not pre-qualify (DNPQ)
Black	Disqualified (DSQ)
White	Did not start (DNS)
White	Withdrew (WD)
White	Race cancelled (C)
Blank	Did not practice (DNP)
Blank	Did not arrive (DNA)
Blank	Excluded (EX)

Two litre class competitors
