= 1981 James Hardie 1000 =

Motor race in Australia

Seasons
- ← 1980 1982 →

Layout of the Mount Panorama Circuit (1938–1986)

The 1981 James Hardie 1000 was the 22nd running of the Bathurst 1000 touring car race. It was held on 4 October 1981 at the Mount Panorama Circuit just outside Bathurst. The race was open to cars eligible to the locally developed CAMS Group C touring car regulations with three engine configuration based classes, a system used uniquely for this race.

For the first time the race did not go the full race distance as on lap 121, an accident involving six cars blocked the track at McPhillamy Park Corner. The Ford Falcon of Dick Johnson and John French were leading the race at the time of the accident and were declared the winners, becoming the first Queenslanders to win the race. Bob Morris and British endurance racer John Fitzpatrick, also driving a Falcon finished second. A lap down in third was Allan Moffat and British endurance racing great Derek Bell driving a Mazda RX-7, the best ever result to that point for a Japanese built car.

History was made at Bathurst in 1981. For the first (and as of 2024, the only) time in the races history, a reigning Formula One World Drivers' Champion drove in the Bathurst 1000. This honour fell to Australia's own 1980 World Champion Alan Jones who co-drove with Warren Cullen in Cullen's V8-engined Holden Commodore.

After 8 wins in the race dating back to Bob Jane and Harry Firth's win in a Ford Falcon XL at Phillip Island in 1962, this would prove to be the last Bathurst 1000 win for the Ford Falcon until 1994. It would also be the 6th and last Bathurst win for the 5.8 L 351 Cleveland V8 engine.

== Class structure ==
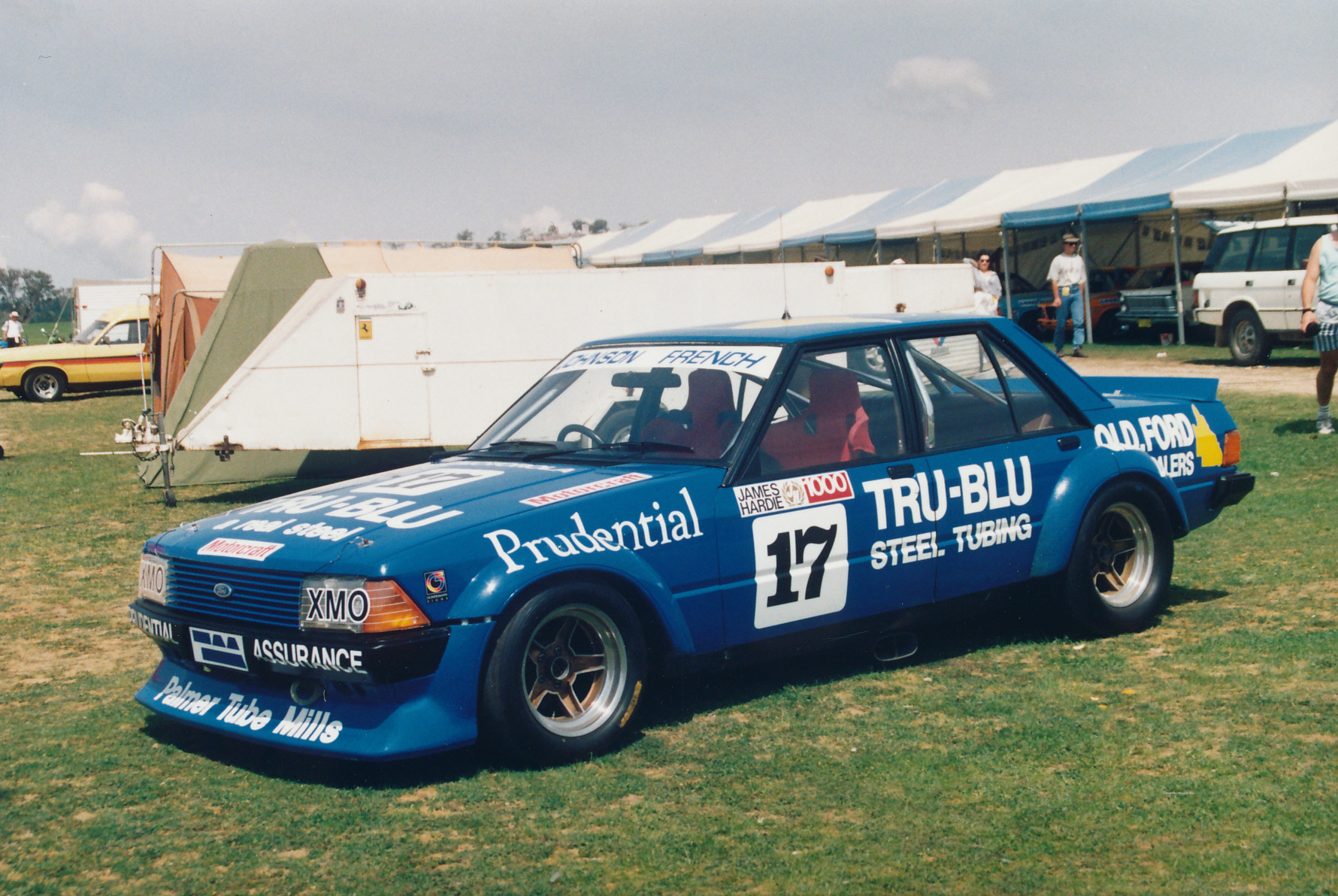
Dick Johnson and John French won the race driving a Ford XD Falcon (image from 1991)

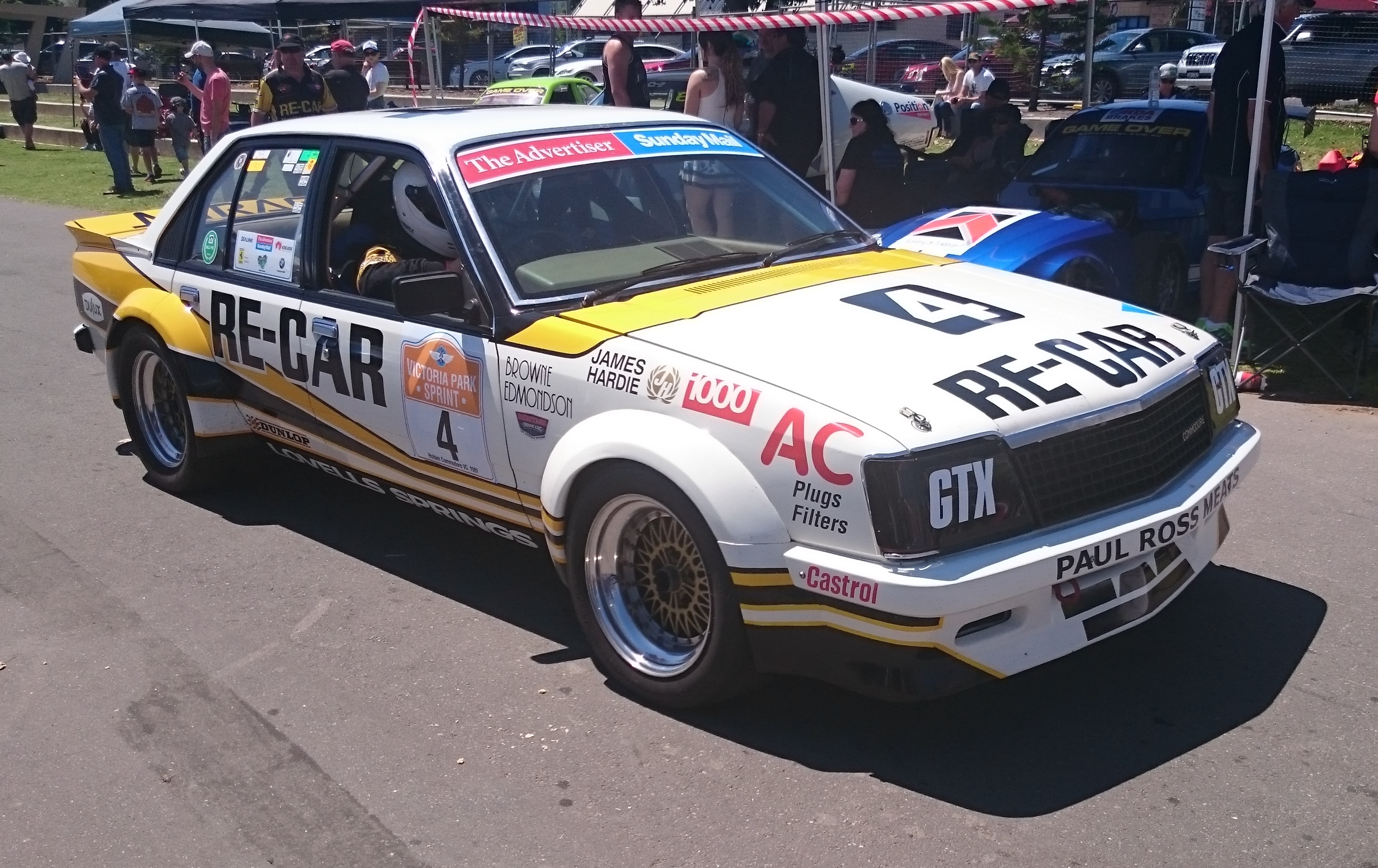
Alan Browne and Tony Edmondson placed fifth in a Holden VC Commodore (image from 2015)

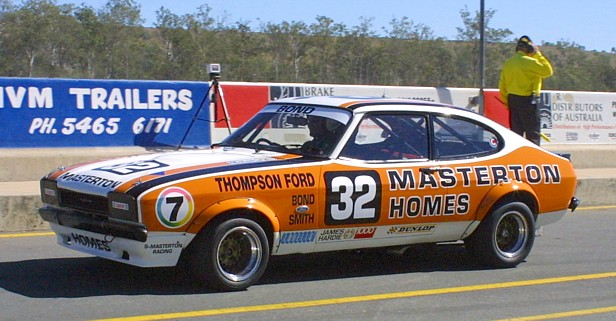
Colin Bond and Don Smith placed eighth in a Ford Capri (image from 2005)

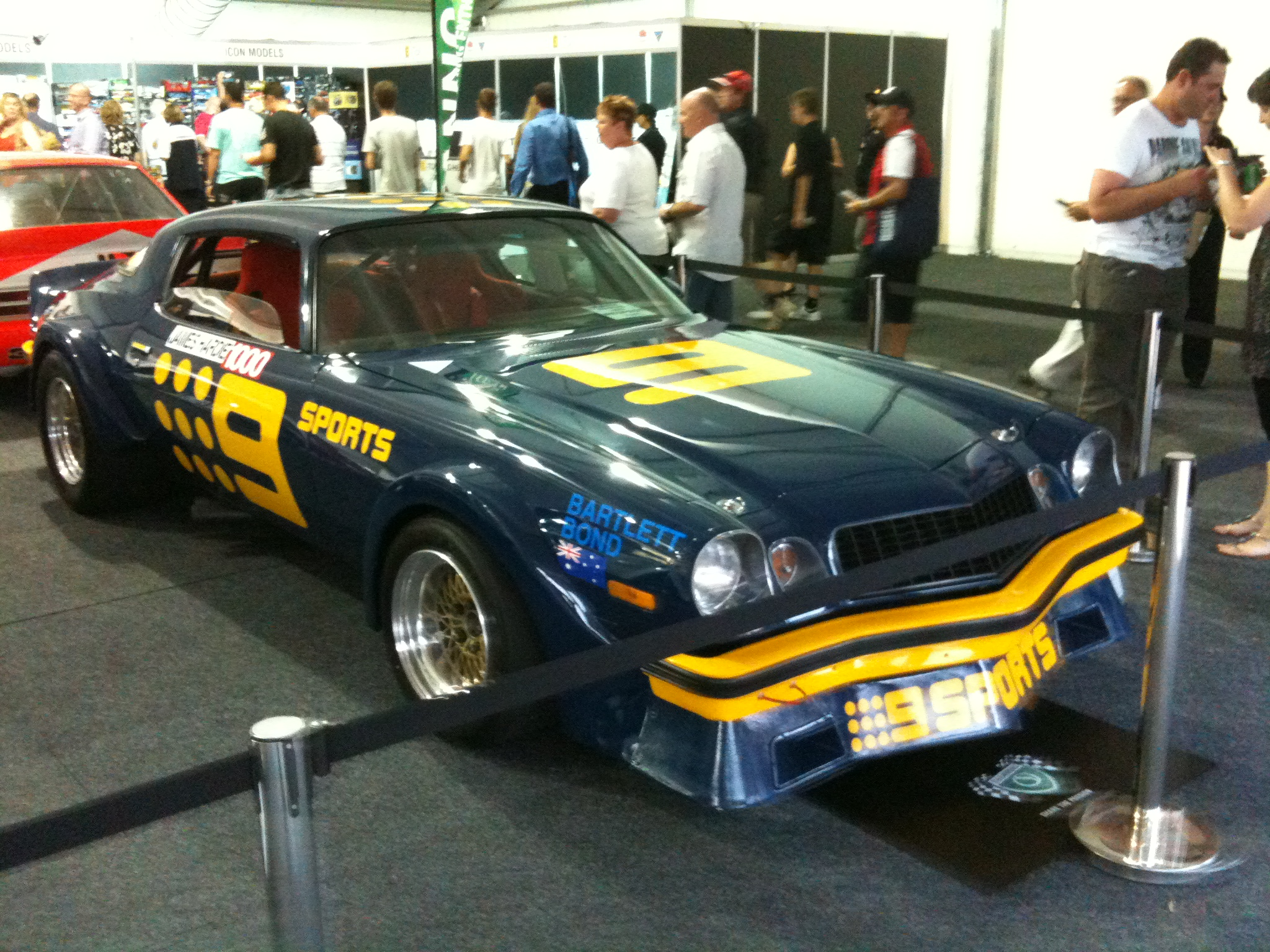
Kevin Bartlett and Bob Forbes placed 13th in a Chevrolet Camaro (image from 2010)

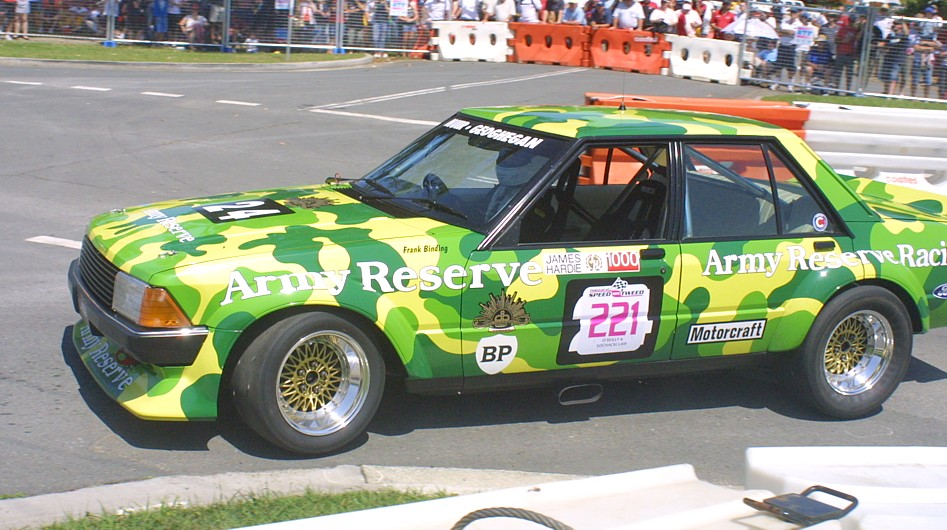
Bob Muir and Ian Geoghegan placed 28th driving a Ford XD Falcon (image from 2009)

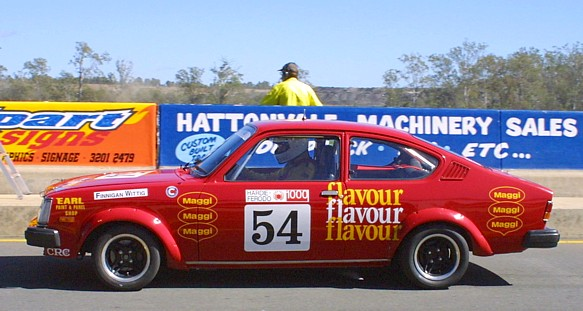
Terry Finnigan and Ross Wittig failed to finish in an Isuzu Gemini (image from 2005)

=== Class : 8 Cylinder & Over ===
This class was almost exclusively for V8s; Holden Commodores, Ford Falcons and Chevrolet Camaros. The exception being a V12 Jaguar XJ-S.

=== Class : 6 Cylinder (Includes Rotary Engines) ===
The class for six-cylinder and rotary-engined cars was contested mostly by Ford Capris, with a single factory supported BMW 635CSi and those Mazda RX-7s entered, powered by rotary engines.

=== Class : 4 Cylinder (Includes 5 Cylinder & Turbo) ===
The class for cars with four-cylinder engines included Alfa Romeo Alfasud, Alfa Romeo Alfetta, Ford Escort, Isuzu Gemini, Mitsubishi Colt, Mitsubishi Lancer, Nissan Bluebird Turbo, Toyota Celica, Toyota Corolla, Triumph Dolomite, and Volkswagen Golf.

== Hardies Heroes ==
Pos	No	Team	Driver	Car	Time
Pole	9	Nine Network Racing Team	(Australia) Kevin Bartlett	Chevrolet Camaro Z28	2:36.432
2	17	Palmer Tube Mills	(Australia) Dick Johnson	Ford XD Falcon	2:38.813
3	05	Marlboro Holden Dealer Team	(Australia) Peter Brock	Holden VC Commodore	2:39.043
4	7	Bob Morris Motor Sport	(Australia) Bob Morris	Ford XD Falcon	2:39.339
5	43	Peter Stuyvesant International Racing	(Canada) Allan Moffat	Mazda RX-7	2:39.443
6	11	Soundwave Discos	(Australia) Garry Rogers	Holden VC Commodore	2:41.315
7	3	Cadbury Schweppes Racing	(Australia) Larry Perkins	Holden VC Commodore	2:42.621
8	25	Marlboro Holden Dealer Team	(Australia) John Harvey	Holden VC Commodore	2:43.018
9	21	Ron Dickson	(Australia) Ron Dickson	Chevrolet Camaro Z28	2:44.505
10	27	Roadways Racing	(Australia) Garth Wigston	Holden VC Commodore	2:46.248

* This was the first Top 10 shootout to be held in wet conditions, though conditions were damp for the first ever shootout in 1978.
* For the 2nd year running, Kevin Bartlett was fastest qualifier and won Hardies Heroes in his Channel 9 sponsored Chevrolet Camaro. It was also the second year in a row that Dick Johnson would equal Bartlett's time in qualifying, but would be slower in the shootout. Due to the extremely wet conditions, Bartlett's runoff time was almost 16 seconds slower than his time in qualifying.
* This was the first time a car powered by something other than a V8 engine had contested Hardies Heroes. The honor went to the 12A Rotary powered Mazda RX-7 of Allan Moffat who ended up 5th on the grid.
* Mazda became the fourth manufacturer to contest Hardies Heroes following on from Ford, Holden and Chevrolet.
* The gap of 2.381 seconds between Bartlett and Johnson broke the 1979 record of 1.966 seconds between Peter Brock and Bob Morris. As of the 2024 race, Bartlett's shootout record remains unbeaten.
* Roadways Racing's Garth Wigston spun his Holden Commodore through Murrays Corner on both of his laps during the runoff, losing between 10 and 20 seconds each time. With his best recorded time of 2:46.248 being only 9.8 seconds slower than Bartlett's pole time, it suggested that a much higher qualifying position might have gone begging for the Tasmanian driver.

== Race ==
The race was stopped on lap 122 because of a multiple-car incident that blocked the track at McPhillamy Park Corner. The accident began with a collision between the Ford Falcons of Bob Morris and Christine Gibson. Garry Rogers and Tony Edmondson (both driving Holden Commodores) and the Isuzu Gemini of David Seldon collided with already crashed cars with the Chevrolet Camaro of Kevin Bartlett being the final car to be involved.

According to the regulations, the race was declared based on the timesheets as the race leader, at the time John French, completed lap 120. This is done so that crashed vehicles can be included in the results. This was particularly significant in this instance as a significant number of the vehicles involved held high race position. Morris was second, Rogers fourth, Edmondson fifth and Christine Gibson sixth.

== Results ==
Pos	Class	No	Team	Drivers	Car	Laps	Qual Pos	Shootout Pos
1	8 Cylinder & Over	17	Palmer Tube Mills	(Australia) Dick Johnson (Australia) John French	Ford XD Falcon	120	1	2
2	8 Cylinder & Over	7	Bob Morris Motor Sport	(Australia) Bob Morris (United Kingdom) John Fitzpatrick	Ford XD Falcon	120	4	4
3	6 Cylinder & Rotary	43	Peter Stuyvesant International Racing	(Canada) Allan Moffat (United Kingdom) Derek Bell	Mazda RX-7	119	9	5
4	8 Cylinder & Over	11	Soundwave Discos	(Australia) Garry Rogers (United Kingdom) Clive Benson-Browne	Holden VC Commodore	118	7	6
5	8 Cylinder & Over	4	Re-Car Racing	(Australia) Alan Browne (Australia) Tony Edmondson	Holden VC Commodore	117	11	
6	8 Cylinder & Over	20	King George Tavern	(Australia) Joe Moore (Australia) Christine Gibson	Ford XD Falcon	115	25	
7	6 Cylinder & Rotary	44	JPS Team BMW	(Australia) Allan Grice (United Kingdom) David Hobbs	BMW 635 CSi	113	12	
8	6 Cylinder & Rotary	32	Masterton Homes	(Australia) Colin Bond (Australia) Don Smith	Ford Capri Mk.II	113	32	
9	8 Cylinder & Over	8	Garry Willmington Performance	(Australia) Garry Willmington (Australia) Mike Griffin	Ford XD Falcon	113	18	
10	8 Cylinder & Over	15	Valley Meat Hall	(Australia) John English (Australia) John Donnelly	Ford XD Falcon	112	22	
11	6 Cylinder & Rotary	33	Masterton Homes	(Australia) Steve Masterton (Australia) Bruce Stewart	Ford Capri Mk.II	111	34	
12	4 Cylinder	77	Peter Williamson Toyota	(Australia) Peter Williamson (Australia) John Smith	Toyota Celica	111	36	
13	8 Cylinder & Over	9	Nine Network Racing Team	(Australia) Kevin Bartlett (Australia) Bob Forbes	Chevrolet Camaro Z28	111	2	1
14	8 Cylinder & Over	29	Brian Callaghan Racing	(Australia) Brian Callaghan (Australia) Peter McKay	Ford XD Falcon	111	24	
15	8 Cylinder & Over	26	Scotty Taylor Holden	(Australia) Alan Taylor (Australia) Kevin Kennedy	Holden VC Commodore	109	29	
16	8 Cylinder & Over	21	Ron Dickson	(Australia) Ron Dickson (Australia) Bob Stevens	Chevrolet Camaro Z28	108	10	9
17	6 Cylinder & Rotary	39	Capri Components	(Australia) Lawrie Nelson (Australia) Peter Jones	Ford Capri Mk.III	108	41	
18	6 Cylinder & Rotary	46	Hulcraft Autos	(Australia) John Gates (Australia) John Craft	Ford Capri Mk.III	108	40	
19	4 Cylinder	50	Gary Leggatt	(Australia) Gary Leggatt (Australia) Phil McDonnell	Alfa Romeo GTV6	107	45	
20	4 Cylinder	60	Country Dealer Team	(Australia) Jim Faneco (Australia) Allan Gough	Isuzu Gemini	103	52	
21	8 Cylinder & Over	05	Marlboro Holden Dealer Team	(Australia) Peter Brock (New Zealand) Jim Richards	Holden VC Commodore	103	3	3
22	8 Cylinder & Over	6	John Sands Racing	(Australia) Rusty French (New Zealand) Leo Leonard	Ford XD Falcon	100	30	
23	4 Cylinder	68	Dandenong Mitsubishi	(Australia) Rod Stevens (Australia) Craig Bradtke	Mitsubishi Lancer	100	53	
24	4 Cylinder	59	Bathurst Light Car Club	(Australia) Tony Mulvihill (Australia) Brian Nightingale	Ford Escort Mk.II RS2000	97	56	
25	8 Cylinder & Over	31	Ron Dickson	(Australia) Graham Moore (United States) Steve Dymand	Chevrolet Camaro Z28	96	28	
26	6 Cylinder & Rotary	40	Peter McLeod	(Australia) Peter McLeod (Australia) Peter Dane	Mazda RX-7	96	28	
27	4 Cylinder	64	Bob Holden Motors	(Australia) Phillip Revell (Australia) Ron Barnacle	Ford Escort Mk.II 1.6	93	59	
28	8 Cylinder & Over	24	Army Reserve Racing Team	(Australia) Bob Muir (Australia) Ian Geoghegan	Ford XD Falcon	92	13	
DNF	8 Cylinder & Over	18	Murray Carter Racing	(Australia) Murray Carter (New Zealand) Graeme Lawrence	Ford XD Falcon	109	16	
DNF	4 Cylinder	62	Alexandra Surplice	(Australia) Alexandra Surplice (Australia) Doug Clark	Toyota Corolla Levin	88	47	
NC	8 Cylinder & Over	14	Fred Geissler	(Australia) Fred Geissler (Australia) Graham Watson	Holden VC Commodore	85	14	
NC	4 Cylinder	66	Scottune	(Australia) Ian Burrell (Australia) Rob Shute	Mitsubishi Colt	83	57	
NC	4 Cylinder	49	Jagparts	(Australia) Martin Power (Australia) Brian Winsall	Triumph Dolomite Sprint	80	55	
DNF	8 Cylinder & Over	16	Re-Car Racing	(Australia) Ron Wanless (Australia) Ralph Radburn	Holden VC Commodore	79	15	
NC	4 Cylinder	70	Colin Spencer	(Australia) Colin Spencer (Australia) John White	Isuzu Gemini	75	60	
DNF	8 Cylinder & Over	30	Everlast Battery Service	(Australia) Bill O'Brien (Australia) Gary Cooke	Ford XD Falcon	74	17	
DNF	6 Cylinder & Rotary	41	West End Mazda	(Australia) Barry Jones (Australia) Geoff Leeds	Mazda RX-7	74	26	
DNF	4 Cylinder	61	Rex Monaghan	(Australia) Ray Cutchie (Australia) Ray Farrar	Ford Escort Mk.II 1.6	73	58	
NC	8 Cylinder & Over	10	John Goss Racing	(Australia) John Goss (Australia) Barry Seton	Jaguar XJ-S	73	19	
NC	4 Cylinder	63	Cherry City Ford	(Australia) John Faulkner (Australia) Gary Dumbrell	Ford Escort Mk.II 2.0 GL	72	51	
NC	4 Cylinder	57	Sutton Motors P/L	(Australia) David Seldon (Australia) Gary Rowe	Isuzu Gemini ZZ	70	46	
DNF	8 Cylinder & Over	3	Cadbury Schweppes Racing	(New Zealand) Peter Janson (Australia) Larry Perkins	Holden VC Commodore	67	8	7
DNF	4 Cylinder	56	Nissan Motor Co.	(Japan) Masahiro Hasemi (Japan) Kazuyoshi Hoshino	Nissan Bluebird Turbo	66	31	
DNF	6 Cylinder & Rotary	37	Trend Windows P/L	(Australia) Terry Daly (Australia) Peter Hopwood	Ford Capri Mk.II	56	37	
DNF	6 Cylinder & Rotary	45	Precinct Performance P/L	(Australia) Allan Bryant (Australia) Dean Gall	Mazda RX-7	54	39	
DNF	8 Cylinder & Over	27	Roadways Racing	(Australia) Garth Wigston (Australia) Steve Harrington	Holden VC Commodore	53	6	10
DNF	4 Cylinder	47	Walter Scott	(Australia) Walter Scott (Australia) Peter Walton	Toyota Celica	50	48	
DNF	8 Cylinder & Over	12	Warren Cullen	(Australia) Warren Cullen (Australia) Alan Jones	Holden VC Commodore	48	20	
DNF	6 Cylinder & Rotary	35	Alexander Rotary Engines	(Australia) Phil Alexander (Australia) Ron Gillard	Mazda RX-7	46	38	
DNF	4 Cylinder	52	Bob Holden Motors	(Australia) Bob Holden (Australia) Wally Storey	Ford Escort Mk.II 2.0 GL	44	49	
DNF	8 Cylinder & Over	23	Great Eastland Television	(Australia) Paul Gulson (United States) Rodney Combs	Holden VB Commodore	42	21	
DNF	8 Cylinder & Over	25	Marlboro Holden Dealer Team	(Australia) John Harvey (Australia) Vern Schuppan	Holden VC Commodore	37	5	8
DNF	4 Cylinder	65	HDT Special Vehicles	(Australia) Phil Brock (Australia) Gary Scott	Isuzu Gemini ZZ	36	44	
DNF	4 Cylinder	51	Chickadee Chicken	(Australia) Graeme Bailey (Australia) Steve Land	Toyota Celica	34	42	
DNF	4 Cylinder	58	Graham Mein	(Australia) Graham Mein (Australia) Geoff Russell	Ford Escort Mk.II RS2000	34	50	
DNF	4 Cylinder	55	Nissan	(Australia) George Fury (Australia) Fred Gibson	Nissan Bluebird Turbo	30	43	
DNF	4 Cylinder	54	Terry Finnigan	(Australia) Terry Finnigan (Australia) Ross Wittig	Isuzu Gemini	29	54	
DNF	8 Cylinder & Over	2	Citizen Watches Australia P/L	(Australia) Charlie O'Brien (Australia) Mike Quinn	Holden VC Commodore	16	23	
DNF	6 Cylinder & Rotary	34	Penrith Mazda Centre	(Australia) Terry Shiel (Australia) Don Holland	Mazda RX-7	13	27	
DNF	6 Cylinder & Rotary	42	Mazcars Croyden	(Australia) John Duggan (Australia) Michael O'Hehir	Mazda RX-7	1	35	
DNQ	8 Cylinder & Over	19	Neil Cunningham	(New Zealand) Neil Cunningham (New Zealand) Rod Coppins	Holden VC Commodore			
DNQ	8 Cylinder & Over	22	John Sands 3MP Racing	(Australia) Jim Keogh (Australia) Andrew Newton	Ford XD Falcon			
DNQ	6 Cylinder & Rotary	38	Les Grose	(Australia) Les Grose (Australia) Alan Cant	Ford Capri Mk.III			
DNQ	8 Cylinder & Over	1	Warren Cullen	(Australia) Warren Cullen (Australia) Alan Jones	Holden VC Commodore			
DNQ	4 Cylinder	53	Chris Heyer	(Australia) Chris Heyer (Australia) Peter Lander	Volkswagen Golf			
DNQ	4 Cylinder	71	Ken Harrison	(Australia) Ken Harrison (Australia) Ian Wells	Ford Escort Mk.II 1.6			
DNQ	4 Cylinder	48	Douglas B. Rutter	(Australia) Ken Price (Australia) Steve Jonas	Isuzu Gemini			
DNQ	4 Cylinder	67	Ray Gulson	(Australia) Ray Gulson (Australia) Gordon Mackinlay	Alfa Romeo Alfasud			

== Statistics ==
- Provisional Pole Position - #9 Kevin Bartlett - 2:18.7
- Pole Position - #9 Kevin Bartlett - 2:36.432
- Fastest Lap - #17 Dick Johnson - 2:20.98 (lap record)
- Average Speed - 151 km/h
- Race Time - 4:53:52.7
