= Chrysler Drifter =

Australian panel van and coupe utility

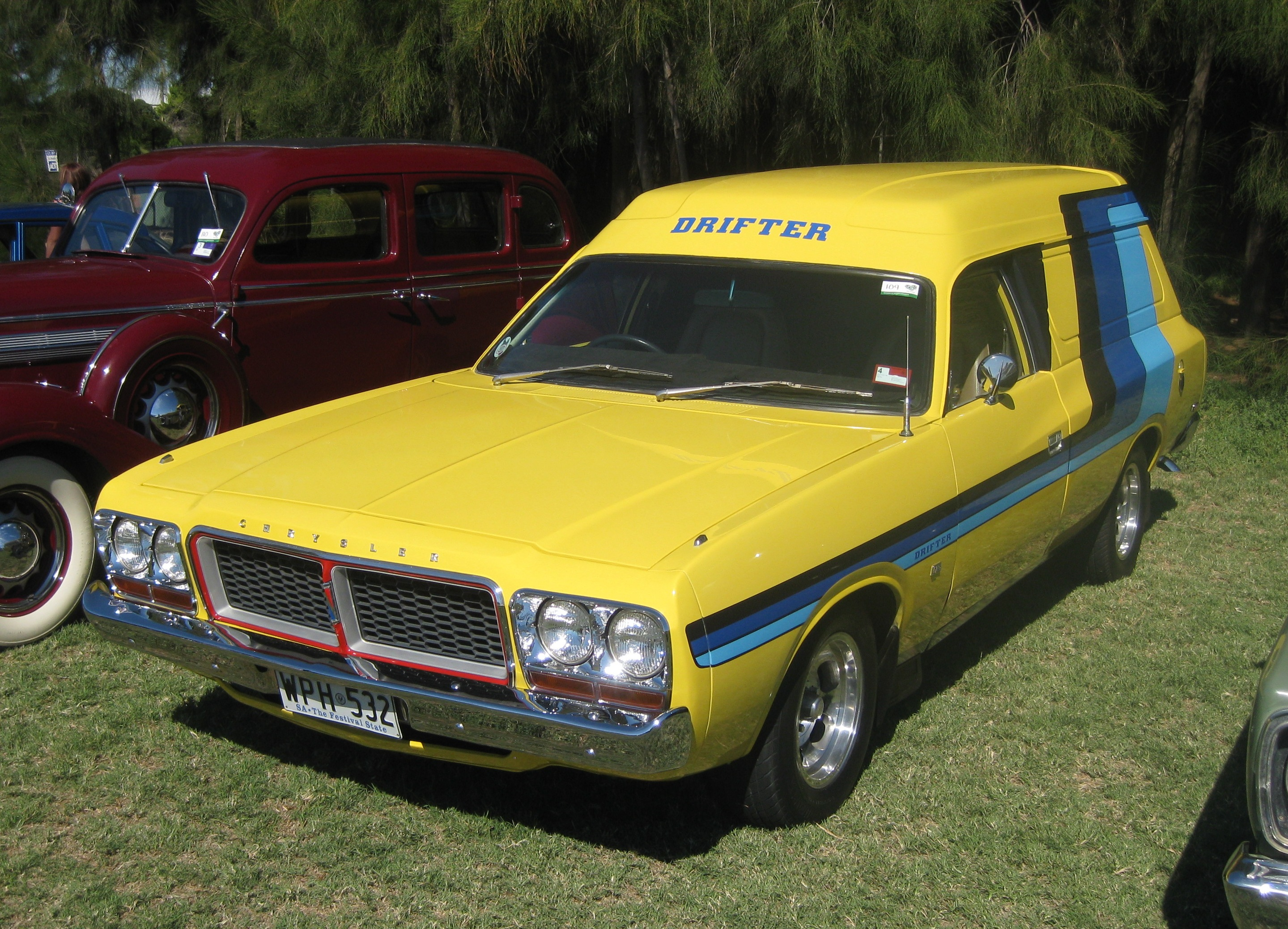
- Chrysler CL Drifter Van

Overview
- Manufacturer: Chrysler Australia
- Production: 1976–1978
- Assembly: Australia
- Designer: Dennis Nicolle

Body and chassis
- Body style: 2-door panel van 2-door coupé utility
- Layout: Front-engine, rear-wheel-drive layout
- Related: Chrysler Valiant

Powertrain
- Engine: 265 cu in (4.3 L) 6-cyl 318 cu in (5.2 L) V8
- Transmission: 4-speed manual

The Chrysler Drifter is a panel van and coupé utility produced by Chrysler Australia from 1977 to 1978.

Chrysler Australia added a panel van to their Chrysler CL Valiant range in April 1977, and a few weeks later they introduced the "Drifter Pack" as an option on that body style. The Drifter Pack included a Chrysler Charger grille, quartz halogen high beam headlights, a sports steering wheel, radial ply tyres, styled wheels and special exterior paint and decal treatment with colour-coded bumpers. The 4.3 litre Hemi 265 engine and a four speed floor shift manual transmission were standard on the Drifter. In spite of its option pack status, Chrysler marketed the model as the Chrysler Drifter without using the name "Valiant". The Drifter pack was also available on the Chrysler Valiant Utility, which was also marketed as the "Chrysler Drifter".

The Drifter styles of the panel van and utility body ended when Chrysler Australia discontinued the CL series. The 1978 CM Valiant range did not include these styles. The brief life of the Drifter was marked by low sales, as competition from comparable offerings from Ford and Holden was stiff.

Chrysler Australia also used the Drifter name on a special edition Charger Drifter, released in 1978.

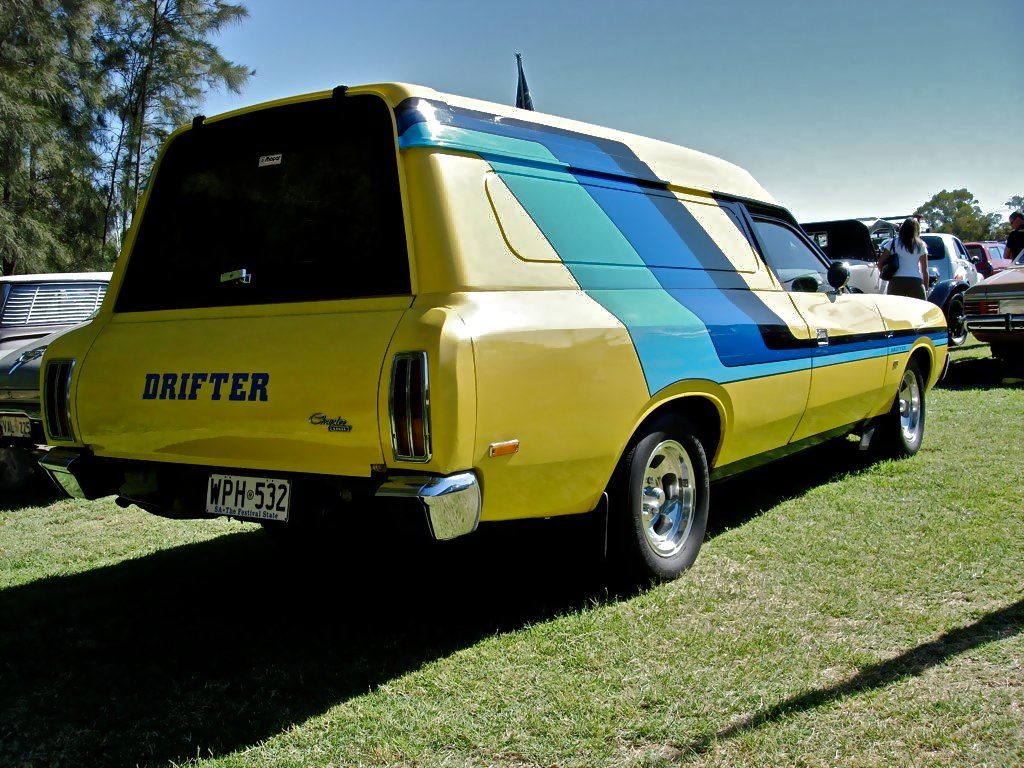
Chrysler CL Drifter Van

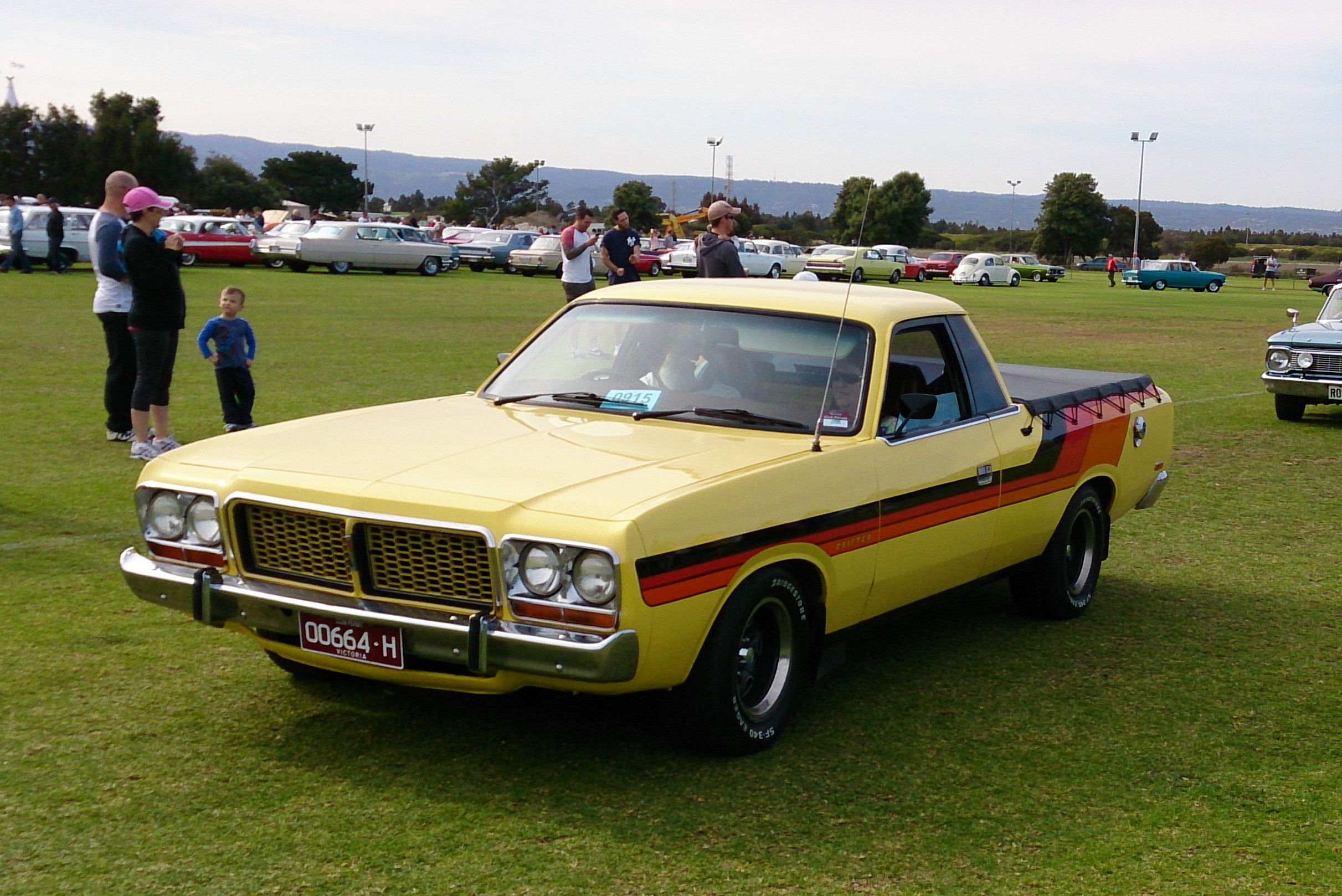
Chrysler CL Drifter Ute

== See also ==
- Car-derived van
