= 1972 Hardie-Ferodo 500 =

Motor race in Australia

Seasons
- ← 1971 1973 →

Layout of the Mount Panorama Circuit (1938-1986)

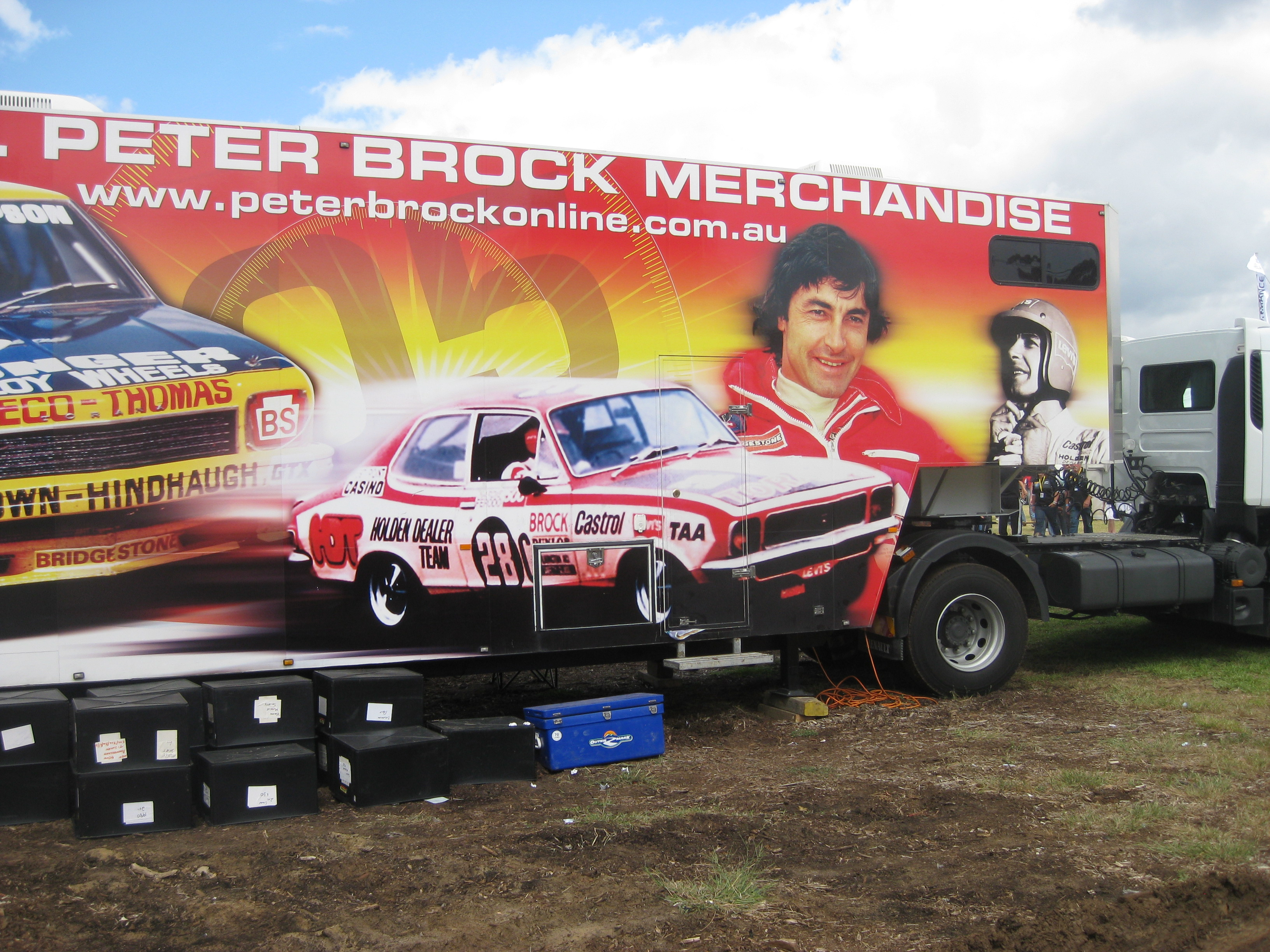
The Official Peter Brock Merchandise Truck features an image of the 1972 Hardie-Ferodo 500 winning Holden Torana

The 1972 Hardie-Ferodo 500 was an endurance motor race open to Group E Series Production Touring Cars. The race was held on 1 October 1972 at the Mount Panorama Circuit just outside Bathurst in New South Wales, Australia. Cars competed in four classes defined by Capacity Price Units, where the engine capacity, expressed in litres (to three decimal places), was multiplied by the purchase price in Australian dollars to arrive at a CP value for each vehicle. It was the 13th running of the Bathurst 500 race and the last to be held over the original distance of 500 miles. It was also the last to allow drivers to compete for the full distance without a relief driver. The race was the third round of the 1972 Australian Manufacturers' Championship.

1972 marked the first year in which rain had significantly affected the race. It was won by Peter Brock driving a Holden Dealer Team prepared Holden Torana, the first of Brock's record nine victories. Brock finished a lap ahead of Queensland racer John French driving a Ford XY Falcon GT-HO Phase III, this despite Brock being penalised one minute at his last pit stop for starting his car while the HDT crew were still re-fueling (under the ARDC's race regulations of the day, car engines had to be switched off during pit stops and could only be restarted once the re-fueling had been completed). A further lap behind was the Chrysler Valiant Charger of Doug Chivas. It was the only time the big three manufacturers of Australia in the 1960s and 1970s all had representatives in the first three outright positions in the race.

Pole sitter and winner of the previous two Bathurst 500's, Allan Moffat, had a trying race. After contesting the lead with Brock in the early laps, Moffat spun his factory entered Ford Falcon at Sulman Park on top of The Mountain in the wet conditions. Although he would fight his way back, he would twice be penalised one minute for restarting his car during pit stops before the re-fueling had been completed. Later in the race the Falcon would also encounter brake problems and Moffat dropped back to finish the race in 9th place, 8 laps down on Brock.

1969 Hardie-Ferodo 500 winner Colin Bond's race ended early when he rolled his Holden Dealer Team Holden Torana on lap 3 while in fourth place. 1967 winner Fred Gibson also rolled his Works GTHO Falcon at McPhillamy Park in the early wet conditions after being forced offline when lapping a slower car. The Falcon spun into the bank and rolled onto its roof on lap 22.

== Class structure ==
=== Class A ===
The class for cars under 3000 CP units was contested by Chrysler Valiant Galant, Datsun 1200, Fiat 850 and Mazda 1300.

=== Class B ===
The 3001 to 9000 CP units class saw a mix of Datsun 1600, Fiat 124 Sport, Ford Escort, 2.8 litre Holden Torana and Mazda RX-2.

=== Class C ===
The 9001 to 18000 CP units class featured Alfa Romeo 1750 GTV, E38 version of the Chrysler Valiant Charger and 3.3 litre Holden Torana GTR XU-1.

=== Class D ===
For cars over 18001 CP units, the class consisted only of E49 version of the Chrysler Valiant Charger and Ford Falcon GT-HO.

== Top 10 Qualifiers ==
Pos	No	Entrant	Driver	Car	Qual
Pole	1	Ford Motor Company of Australia	(Canada) Allan Moffat	Ford XY Falcon GTHO Phase III	2:35.8
2	12	McLeod Ford Pty. Ltd.	(Australia) John Goss	Ford XY Falcon GTHO Phase III	2:36.7
3	5	Bryan Byrt Ford Pty. Ltd.	(Australia) John French	Ford XY Falcon GTHO Phase III	2:37.5
4	8	Ford Motor Company of Australia	(Australia) Fred Gibson	Ford XY Falcon GTHO Phase III	2:38.2
5	28	Holden Dealer Team	(Australia) Peter Brock	Holden LJ Torana GTR XU-1	2:38.2
6	2	Geoghegan Sporty Cars	(Australia) Leo Geoghegan	Chrysler VH Valiant Charger R/T E49	2:39.1
7	24	Holden Dealer Team	(Australia) Colin Bond	Holden LJ Torana GTR XU-1	2:39.5
8	29	N. G. Booth Pty. Ltd.	(Australia) Graham Moore	Holden LJ Torana GTR XU-1	2:40.1
9	15	D. Beck	(Australia) Doug Chivas	Chrysler VH Valiant Charger R/T E49	2:41.1
10	13	Gold Power Automotive Australia Pty. Ltd.	(Australia) Des West	Ford XY Falcon GTHO Phase III	2:41.7

== Results ==
Results sourced in part from:

Pos	Class	No	Entrant	Drivers	Car	Laps	Qual Pos
1	C	28	Holden Dealer Team	(Australia) Peter Brock	Holden LJ Torana GTR XU-1	130	5
2	D	5	Bryan Byrt Ford Pty. Ltd.	(Australia) John French	Ford XY Falcon GT-HO Phase III	129	3
3	D	15	D. Beck	(Australia) Doug Chivas (Australia) Damon Beck	Chrysler VH Valiant Charger R/T E49	128	9
4	D	2	Geoghegan Sporty Cars	(Australia) Leo Geoghegan	Chrysler VH Valiant Charger R/T E49	127	6
5	C	19	Max Wright Motors Pty. Ltd.	(Australia) Don Holland	Holden LJ Torana GTR XU-1	125	11
6	C	27	R. Forbes	(Australia) Bob Forbes	Holden LJ Torana GTR XU-1	124	12
7	D	10	C. P. Gulson	(Australia) Paul Gulson (Australia) Ray Gulson	Ford XY Falcon GT-HO Phase III	123	16
8	C	20	Roamer Watches of Australia Pty. Ltd.	(Australia) Ray Kaleda (Australia) Paul Pressler	Chrysler VH Valiant Charger R/T E38	122	26
9	D	1	Ford Motor Company of Australia	(Canada) Allan Moffat	Ford XY Falcon GT-HO Phase III	122	1
10	D	3	M. Carter	(Australia) Murray Carter	Ford XY Falcon GT-HO Phase III	120	22
11	D	4	Eastside Chrysler	(Australia) Tony Farrell (Australia) Tom Naughton	Chrysler VH Valiant Charger R/T E49	118	21
12	B	44	Rowell Thiele Ford Pty. Ltd.	(Australia) Digby Cooke (Australia) Geoff Leeds	Ford Escort GT 1600 Mk.I	117	31
13	B	37	Mazda Dealer Team	(Australia) Wayne Rogerson	Mazda RX-2	117	27
14	B	41	Mazda Dealer Team	(Australia) Bernie Haehnle	Mazda RX-2	116	39
15	B	36	Finnie Ford Pty. Ltd.	(Australia) Barry Seton (Australia) Herb Taylor	Ford Escort GT 1600 Mk.I	116	34
16	B	38	Slideaway Car Roofs Pty. Ltd.	(Australia) Pat Hogan (Australia) Lakis Manticas	Ford Escort GT 1600 Mk.I	116	28
17	C	25	A. F. & M. Beninca Pty. Ltd.	(Australia) Ray Harrison (Australia) Mal Robertson	Alfa Romeo 1750 GTV	115	33
18	B	52	Bruce Lynton Car Sales	(Australia) Bob Holden	Ford Escort GT 1600 Mk.I	115	38
19	B	43	Rolls Motors Pty. Ltd.	(Australia) Ron Kearns	Fiat 124 Sport	115	37
20	C	32	Leach Motors	(Australia) George Giesberts	Holden LJ Torana GTR XU-1	113	24
21	B	49	Mazda Dealer Team	(Australia) George Garth	Mazda RX-2	112	30
22	B	51	Chas Tierney Pty. Ltd.	(Australia) Mal Brewster (Australia) Ray Strong	Holden LC Torana GTR	112	40
23	B	39	R. Wedd	(Australia) Bob Cracknell (Australia) Bob Wedd	Holden LC Torana GTR	111	36
24	A	73	Datsun Racing Team	(Australia) Bill Evans	Datsun 1200	107	50
25	A	72	Mazda Dealer Team	(Australia) Gary Cooke	Mazda 1300	106	48
26	A	63	Datsun Racing Team	(Australia) Jon Leighton	Datsun 1200	106	53
27	A	62	Mazda Dealer Team	(Australia) Lynn Brown	Mazda 1300	106	49
28	A	64	Bainbridge Motors	(Australia) Mel Mollison (Australia) M Hayson	Mazda 1300	105	47
29	B	53	B. Bassingthwaighte / R. Hanger	(Australia) Ray Hanger (Australia) Barry Bassingthwaite	Ford Escort Twin Cam Mk.I	105	43
30	A	75	W.H. Motors Pty. Ltd.	(Australia) Bruce Stewart	Datsun 1200	105	57
31	A	70	John Palmer Motors	(Australia) John Leffler	Mazda 1300	104	55
32	A	61	W.H. Motors Pty. Ltd.	(Australia) Don Smith	Datsun 1200	103	56
33	B	45	Davidson Motors	(Australia) Doug Grimson (Australia) Morrie Miller	Datsun 1600	103	54
34	A	71	L. C. Giddings & Son	(Australia) Ray Lintott	Datsun 1200	102	60
35	A	69	Formula 1 Europa-Garage	(Australia) Gary Leggatt	Fiat 850 Coupe	101	52
DNF	B	48	Olbis Industries	(Australia) Eric Olsen	Ford Escort Twin Cam Mk.I	104	32
DNF	C	21	G. Lister	(Australia) Gerry Lister (Australia) David Seldon	Holden LJ Torana GTR XU-1	103	15
DNF	B	42	A. R. Keith	(Australia) Alan Keith	Ford Escort Twin Cam Mk.I		42
DNF	A	66	Collins Motors	(Australia) Roger Bonhomme	Chrysler Valiant Galant	94	59
DNF	B	47	Pacific Film Laboratories Pty. Ltd.	(Australia) Christine Gibson (Australia) Jan Holland	Holden LJ Torana 2850	88	44
DNF	D	14	Essendon Chrysler	(Australia) Lawrie Nelson (Australia) Tony Roberts	Chrysler VH Valiant Charger R/T E49		13
DNF	A	68	Datsun Racing Team	(Australia) Doug Whiteford	Datsun 1200	76	51
DNF	D	13	Gold Power Automotive Australia Pty. Ltd.	(Australia) Des West	Ford XY Falcon GT-HO Phase III	74	10
DNF	C	29	N. G. Booth Pty. Ltd.	(Australia) Graham Moore	Holden LJ Torana GTR XU-1	72	8
DNF	C	30	D. & P. Traders Pty Ltd	(Australia) Pat Peck	Holden LJ Torana GTR XU-1	71	25
DNF	B	46	M. Grayson	(Australia) Max Grayson (Australia) Bill Gates	Ford Escort Twin Cam Mk.I	68	41
DNF	C	31	Ron Hodgson Motors	(Australia) Bruce McPhee	Holden LJ Torana GTR XU-1	66	19
DNF	B	54	Bryan Byrt Ford Pty. Ltd.	(Australia) Lyndon Arnel	Ford Escort Twin Cam Mk.I	64	35
DNF	A	65	Datsun Racing Team Qld.	(Australia) Barry Tapsall	Datsun 1200	46	58
DNF	D	11	Formula 1 Europa-Garage	(Australia) Tony Allen (Australia) Len Searle	Chrysler VH Valiant Charger R/T E49	36	20
DNF	D	12	McLeod Ford Pty. Ltd.	(Australia) John Goss	Ford XY Falcon GT-HO Phase III	24	2
DNF	B	40	Brian Wood Ford	(Australia) Jim Murcott	Ford Escort Twin Cam Mk.I	23	29
DNF	D	8	Ford Motor Company of Australia	(Australia) Fred Gibson	Ford XY Falcon GT-HO Phase III	22	4
DNF	C	33	W. S. Negus	(Australia) Wayne Negus (Australia) Neville Grigsby	Holden LJ Torana GTR XU-1	21	14
DNF	C	22	P. Ramsay	(Australia) Bill Brown	Holden LJ Torana GTR XU-1	20	18
DNF	D	9	Lakemba Chrysler	(Australia) Graham Ryan	Chrysler VH Valiant Charger R/T E49	14	17
DNF	B	50	H. L. Vines	(Australia) Herb Vines (Australia) Chris Batger	Ford Escort Twin Cam Mk.I	8	45
DNF	C	24	Holden Dealer Team	(Australia) Colin Bond	Holden LJ Torana GTR XU-1	2	7
DSQ	A	67	Bainbridge Motors	(Australia) Geoff Perry	Mazda 1300	107	46
DNS	A	74	Victorian Police Motor Sports Club	(Australia) Fred Sutherland	Mazda 1300		
DNS	C	35	Cessnock Motor Works Pty. Ltd.	(Australia) Allan Grice	Holden LJ Torana GTR XU-1		

== Statistics ==
- Pole Position - #1 Allan Moffat - 2:35.8
- Fastest Lap - #1 Allan Moffat - 2:36.5 (lap record)
- Average Speed - 133 km/h
- Race time of winning car - 6:01:53 (including one minute penalty)
- One minute penalties were applied to #28 Peter Brock (starting car while refueling), #3 Murray Carter and #53 Bassingthwaite/Hanger (push starts)
- Two one minute penalties were applied to both #1 Allan Moffat (starting car while refueling) and #2 Leo Geoghegan (push starts)
