= Ford XY Falcon GT =

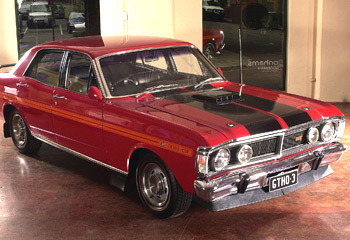

Overview
- Manufacturer: Ford Australia
- Production: 1970–1972
- Assembly: Broadmeadows, Australia

Body and chassis
- Class: Sports sedan
- Body style: 4-door sedan
- Layout: FR layout

Chronology
- Predecessor: Ford XW Falcon GT

The Ford Falcon XY GT is a sports sedan based on the Ford Falcon XY. Released in 1970 by Ford Australia, with the GTHO Phase III released in 1971. Some 1,557 units were produced from September 1970 to December 1971, with 300 GTHO Phase IIIs produced from May 1971 to November 1971. It was the fourth in the initial series of the Ford Falcon GT. A limited number were exported to South Africa, wearing Fairmont GT badging.

The engine type was a 351 Cleveland (carried over from the XW GT/GT-HO Phase II).

== Technical details ==
- Engine: 351 cubic inch Cleveland V8 (5.763 litre)
- Bore and stroke: 102 mm × 89 mm (4.0 in × 3.5 in)
- Power (DIN): 224 kW (300 bhp) at 5400 rpm (factory claim)
- Torque (DIN:) 515Nm (380 lb-ft) at 3400 rpm (factory claim)
- Compression ratio: 10.3:1
- Configuration: front mounted, longitudinal, 90 degree V8
- Head design: pushrod and rocker OHV with Hydraulic lifters
- Exhaust system: cast iron manifold, low restriction twin exhaust
- Fuel system: 600cfm Autolite four-barrel carburettor
- Ignition system: single point distributor
- Manual gearbox :
- Type: four-speed all-synchronised
- 1st: 2.78:1
- 2nd: 1.93:1
- 3rd: 1.36:1
- 4th: 1.00:1
- Reverse: 2.78:1
- Manual gearbox :
- Type: four-speed all-synchronised close ratio
- 1st: 2.32:1
- 2nd: 1.69:1
- 3rd: 1.29:1
- 4th: 1.00:1
- Reverse: 2.32:1
- Automatic transmission:
- Type: heavy duty three-speed C6 OR FMX
- Rear axle:

Type: 9-inch LSD traction lock is standard with 28 spline axles or 31 spline optional

- Manual ratio: 3.25:1 standard with optional 3.5:1 or 3.91:1
- Automatic ratio: 2.75:1
- Suspension:

Front: independent ball joint, coil springs, shock absorbers, wishbones and anti-roll bar Upper control arm to accept the three-pin ball joint used, as opposed to the four-point ball joint used in the normal GTs and earlier GTHOs

- Rear: Hotchkiss type with semi-elliptic leaf springs, shock absorbers and live axle
- Brakes:

Front: 286 mm (11.3 in) servo assisted discs Rear: 254 mm (10.0 in) servo assisted drums

- Steering:

Type: re-circulating ball power assistance (optional)

- Ratio: 16:1
- Wheels and tyres:
- Wheels: 6.0 x 14 steel - steel "five-slot" with "S" steel dress ring and centre cap

7.0 x 15 alloy - "five-spoke' Bathurst Globe (optional) from 1972

- Tyres: 185 x 14 - E70HR14
- Instrumentation:
- Speedometer: 140 mph
- Cleveland tachometer: 8000 rpm
- Oil pressure: gauge
- Water temperature: gauge
- Fuel: gauge
- Ignition: warning light
- High beam: warning light
- Brakes: warning light
- Clock: analogue
- Dimensions:
- Length: 4,689 mm (184.6 in)
- Width: 1,869 mm (73.6 in)
- Height: 1,397 mm (55.0 in)
- Wheelbase: 2,819 mm (111.0 in)
- Front track: 1,499 mm (59.0 in)
- Rear track 1,486 mm (58.5 in)
- Weight: 1325 kg (manual) 1415 kg (auto)
- Turning circle: 11.2 m (37 ft)
- Fuel tank: 75 litre (16.4 gallons) - 163.8 litre (36.0gl) optional
- Seating: five
- Performance:
- Top speed: 210 km/h (130 mph) (auto)

Standing 1/4 mile (400 m) - 14.4 seconds (manual )

== GTHO Phase III ==
The Ford Falcon GTHO Phase III was built for homologation, looked almost identical to the GT and was a modified version of the Falcon GT built in 1971 with a heavily upgraded engine, a four-speed top-loader gearbox and Detroit locker nine inch differential. It was also equipped with special brakes and handling package, plus a 36 imperial gallons (164 litres) fuel tank.

Winner of the 1971 Bathurst 500, driven by Allan Moffat, the Phase III has been described as "...simply one of the best cars in the world, a true GT that could take on Ferraris and Astons on their own terms..." by Sports Car World.

The GTHO's 351 Cleveland engine output was understated as 300 bhp (220 kW) to satisfy insurers. It is generally accepted to produce in the region of 350–380 bhp (260–280 kW). Initial cars were equipped with an electrical rev limiter which came into effect at 6,150 rpm. With the rev limiter disabled, the engine was reputed to pull in excess of 7,000 rpm, even in fourth gear. At that time the Phase III GTHO was touted as being the world's fastest four-door production car. However, the Phase III GTHO, in full street trim, was only ever clocked at 142mph by Wheels magazine in October 1971, and this yellow example was running the 3.25:1 rear axle with the QC motor. The 1969 Dodge Polara Pursuit four-door, in full street trim, running the optional 440ci/375hp V8 automatic was officially clocked at 147mph by Michigan State Police at Chrysler's Chelsea Proving Grounds. Although this latter vehicle was specified by the California Highway Patrol and supplied by Chrysler, the general public could option the very same car (sans the lights and sirens) from their local dealer. Equivalent four-door Polaras were available in 1970 and 1971, albeit with minor power reductions, but were not tested, so it will never be truly known if the Phase III GTHO was the "world's fastest four-door production car" in 1971.

Performance:

Top speed: 228 km/h (142 mph) at 6150rpm 0 – 60 mph: 6.4 seconds 0 – 100 km - 6.9 seconds Standing 1/4 mile (400 m): 14.4 seconds using the standard 3.25:1 Detroit Locker diff ratio. An optional 3.9:1 ratio differential was available and reputedly enabled such cars to cover the 1/4 mile in 13.9 seconds.

Bathurst (6,172 km: 1938-1986) (6,213 km: 1987–present) fastest lap time: 2:36.5 by Allan Moffat (1972 Hardie-Ferodo 500 - Ford Falcon XY GTHO Phase III)

=== Value ===
The Phase III GTHO is in incredibly high demand with collectors and investors. Good examples have been sold for prices in excess of A$1,000,000, including a car once owned by Australian cricketer Jeff Thomson. Lloyds Auctions sold the pristine and provenanced car for $1,030,000 at its weekend auction in Bathurst, NSW. This demand is, in part, due to a small production run, and 'fewer than 100 remaining' examples of the GTHO.

A Falcon XY GTHO Phase III was sold at by Bonhams & Goodmans at auction for A$683,650 in March 2007. The car had only 40,000 km on the clock. The buyer of the car said it will be garaged, and that it will not be driven, but that he will be "keeping it as an investment". The sale price set a new auction record for Australian sport sedans. Whilst in June 2007 another Phase III sold for A$750,000.

=== Race record ===
The Falcon GTHO Phase III succeeded in an outright win at Bathurst in the 1971 Hardie-Ferodo 500 and also secured the 1973 Australian Touring Car Championship (ATCC) title; in both instances the cars were driven by Allan Moffat.

Ian "Pete" Geoghegan and Moffat had great success with the Phase III in Australian production touring car racing where it scored many race wins from the latter half of 1971 through to 1973. One of the Phase IIIs driven by Moffat is now owned by Bowden's Own, an Australian car care products company. This particular example was a replacement vehicle fettled in September 1972, the original 1971 Bathurst winning car having been badly damaged at Adelaide International Raceway in the opening round of the 1972 Australian Manufacturers Championship; this particular GTHO was subsequently driven to a number of victories by Moffat and enabled him to secure the overall 1973 ATCC honours.

In 1970, the Ford Works Team under the direction of team manager Al Turner, built two "Super Falcons" using the XW GTHO Phase II as the basis for the cars. Ford looked to translate the work that had gone into the Ford Mustang Boss 302 into the local Falcon model with the car using a fuel injected and much higher developed 5.8 L (351 cu in) Cleveland V8 engine. According to those who drove the cars (Alan Moffat, Ian Geoghegan and John French), the Super Falcon's biggest problem was that the 600 bhp (447 kW; 608 PS) the engine produced was simply too much for the light weight chassis to handle and power oversteer was the order of the day. Turner initially did not believe Moffat when he told him this, believing that the car was simply being driven wrong. At the Mallala Circuit in South Australia, Moffat took Turner for a lap of the circuit in his Falcon in a successful bid to show the team boss what the car was really like to drive.

Moffat virtually abandoned the Super Falcon in the 1971 and 1972 ATCCs (which by this time had been upgraded with XY bodywork) in favour of his better handling Boss 302 Mustang. In 1972, Geoghegan went the opposite way and abandoned his own well developed Ford Mustang GTA to drive his Falcon. After fixing the problem with the chassis, Geoghegan was able to get the best out of the car and won a memorable third round of the 1972 ATCC at the Mount Panorama Circuit after a long race with the Mustang of Moffat. The race is often seen as the best in the ATCC's history.

- 1st 1971 Hardie-Ferodo 500 at Mount Panorama
- 1st 1971 Australian Manufacturers' Championship, round five at Surfers Paradise
- 1st 1972 South Pacific Touring Series
- 1st 1972 Australian Touring Car Championship, round three, Mount Panorama
- 1st 1972 Australian Manufacturers' Championship, round two, Sandown Park (1972 Sandown 250)
- 1st 1972 Australian Manufacturers' Championship, round four, Phillip Island
- 1st 1972 Australian Manufacturers' Championship, round five, Surfers Paradise
- 1st 1973 Australian Touring Car Championship, round one, Symmons Plains
- 1st 1973 Australian Touring Car Championship, round two, Calder Park
- 1st 1973 Australian Touring Car Championship, round three, Sandown Park
- 1st 1973 Australian Touring Car Championship, round four, Wanneroo Park
- 1st 1973 Australian Touring Car Championship, round seven, Oran Park

== Successor to the GTHO Phase III ==
In 1972, the XY series Falcon was replaced by the XA Falcon range. Production of approximately 200 XA-based Falcon GT-HO Phase IV cars was originally scheduled to take place in June and July 1972, but this was terminated at 'the eleventh hour' due to what became known as "the supercar scare". The Sun-Herald newspaper had run this as a front-page lead article (with banner headline in large capital letters) on Sunday 25 June 1972: "160mph 'super cars' soon". A copy of that front page is shown at the start of a Phase IV documentary.

Only one road vehicle had been completed when production was cancelled. Three standard GTs were being converted into GT-HOs by the Ford factory race team for the Sandown 500 in September and Bathurst 500 in October 1972. Only one of these racers was ever completed and the other two were finished after being sold or given to specific individuals or dealers by Ford Australia. The Phase IV was never officially released.

Recently one of three Phase 4 prototypes manufactured by Ford Special vehicles to compete at Bathurst 1972 was sold for $1,750,000 a world record price after spending over 20 years with its previous collector owner Paul Carthew.
