= John French (racing driver) =

Australian racing driver (1930–2025)

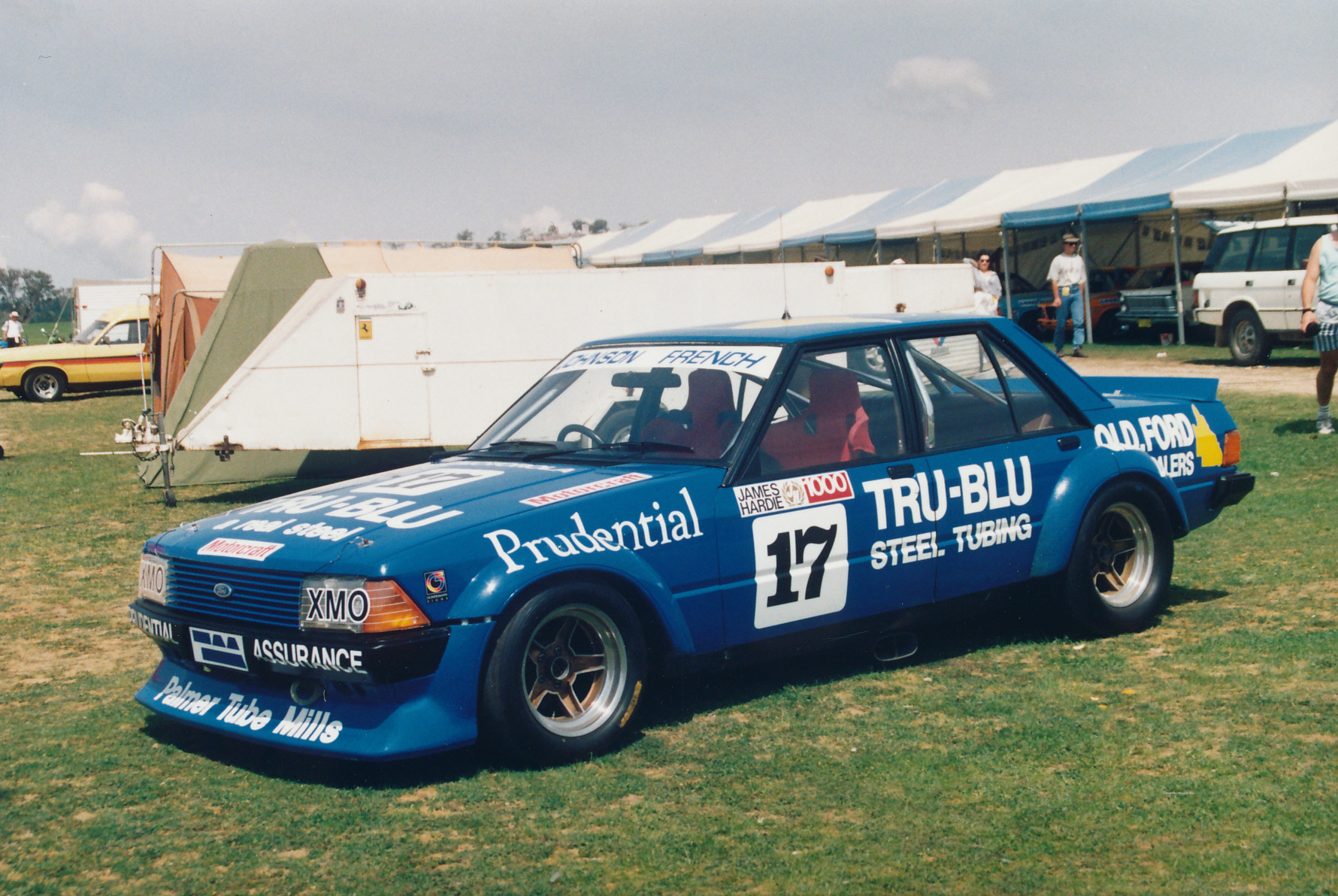
- The car with which French and Dick Johnson won the 1981 Bathurst 1000
- Nationality: Australian
- Born: 28 November 1930 Millaa Millaa, Queensland, Australia
- Died: 12 March 2025 (aged 94) Brisbane, Queensland, Australia

John French (28 November 1930 – 12 March 2025) was an Australian racing driver.

== Biography ==
French was born in Millaa Millaa, Queensland, and his long career lasted from the 1960s to the early 1980s. He won the 1962 Australian GT Championship driving a Centaur-Waggott and in 1969 French paired with Allan Moffat to win the Sandown Three Hour race in a Ford Falcon GTHO Phase I. French was a well-known multi-franchise car dealer selling BMC vehicles, Alfa Romeo, Renault, Peugeot and Subaru in Brisbane. Many of the marques he sold featured prominently in his professional racing career.

Nationally however, French was best remembered as Dick Johnson's co-driver to win the crash-shortened 1981 Bathurst 1000 (French was driving the #17 Ford XD Falcon when the race was stopped, but wasn't one of the cars in the accident). He regularly drove the works Ford Falcon GTHO's alongside Allan Moffat, and also drove Moffat's and Ian Geoghegan's Improved Production Ford Falcon GTHOs in the Australian Touring Car Championship rounds when Moffat and Geoghegan were driving their Mustangs.

French died in Brisbane, Queensland on 12 March 2025, at the age of 94.

== Gallery ==
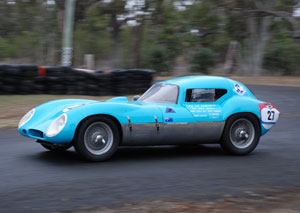
The Centaur Waggott with which French won the 1962 Australian GT Championship

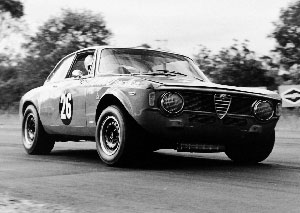
Alfa Romeo GTA at Lakeside 1971, 18 April 1971

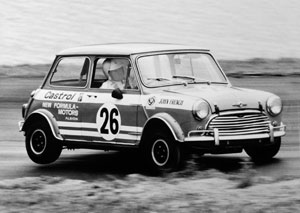
Morris Mini Cooper S at Lakeside, 16 May 1971

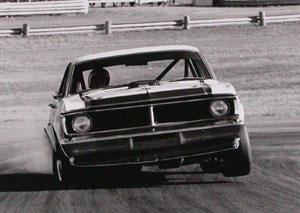
John French in Ian Geoghegan's Improved Production Ford Falcon GTHO at Lakeside, 25 July 1971

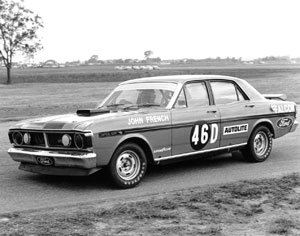
Ford Falcon GTHO Phase III at Surfers Paradise International Raceway, 6 February 1972

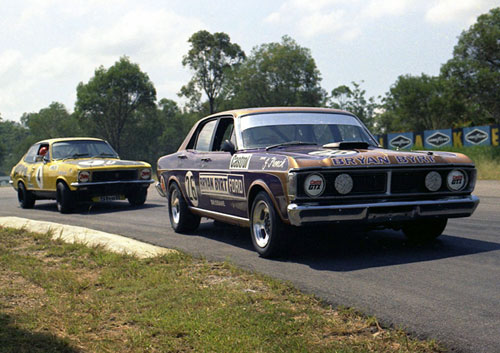
Bryan Byrt Ford sponsored Ford Falcon GTHO Phase III at Lakeside, 10 October 1972

== Career results ==
Season	Series	Position	Car	Entrant
1962	Australian GT Championship	**1st**	Centaur Waggott	GP Cars Racing Team
1964	Australian Touring Car Championship	8th	Morris Cooper S	Peter Uscinski P/L
1966	Australian Touring Car Championship	6th	Morris Cooper S	J. French
1967	Australian Touring Car Championship	8th	Morris Cooper S	J. French
1969	Australian Touring Car Championship	10th	Alfa Romeo 1750 GTV	Alec Mildren Racing
1970	Australian Touring Car Championship	12th	Morris Cooper S	British Leyland Racing Team
1971	Australian Touring Car Championship	6th	Ford XY Falcon GTHO Phase III	Allan Moffat Racing; Geoghegans Sporty Cars
1972	South Pacific Touring Series	10th	Ford Falcon GTHO	Ford Motor Company of Australia Ltd.
1972	Australian Touring Car Championship	23rd	Ford XY Falcon GTHO Phase III	Bryan Byrt Ford
1974	Australian Touring Car Championship	10th	Alfa Romeo 2000 GTV	
1975	Australian Touring Car Championship	9th	Alfa Romeo 2000 GTV	Alfa Romeo Dealers Aust.
1980	Australian Touring Car Championship	24th	Alfa Romeo 2000 GTV	
1982	Australian Endurance Championship	NC	Ford XE Falcon	Palmer Tube Mills
1983	Australian Endurance Championship	NC	Nissan Bluebird Turbo	Nissan Motor Co. Australia P/L
1984	Australian Endurance Championship	NC	Ford XE Falcon	Palmer Tube Mills
1985	Australian Endurance Championship	NC	Holden VK Commodore	Alf Grant
1986	Australian Endurance Championship	NC	Holden VK Commodore SS Group A	Dulux Auto Colour
1987	World Touring Car Championship	NC	Mitsubishi Starion Turbo	Ralliart Australia

=== Complete World Touring Car Championship results ===
(key) (Races in bold indicate pole position) (Races in italics indicate fastest lap)

Year	Team	Car	1	2	3	4	5	6	7	8	9	10	11	DC	Points
1987	Ralliart Australia	Mitsubishi Starion Turbo	MNZ	JAR	DIJ	NUR	SPA	BNO	SIL	BAT; DND*	CLD	WEL	FJI	NC	0

* French was listed as a driver in the #16 Ralliart Australia Starion, though he did not drive in the race.

=== Complete Phillip Island/Bathurst 500/1000 results ===
Year	Team	Co-drivers	Car	Class	Laps	Overall position	Class position
1960	(Australia) Australian Motor Industries	(Australia) Norm Beechey	Standard Vanguard	D	162	5th	2nd
1964	(Australia) Ron Hodgson Motors Pty Ltd	(Australia) Ron Hodgson	Ford Cortina Mk.I GT	C	127	5th	4th
1965	(Australia) BMC	(Australia) John Harvey	Morris Cooper S	C	24	DNF	DNF
1966	BMC Australia	(Australia) Steve Harvey	Morris Cooper S	C	127	8th	8th
1967	(Australia) BMC Works Team	(Finland) Timo Mäkinen	Morris Cooper S	C	127	7th	**3rd**
1968	(Australia) Alec Mildren (Qld)	(Australia) Frank Gardner	Alfa Romeo 1750 GTV	E		DSQ	DSQ
1969	(Australia) Alec Mildren Alfa Romeo	(Australia) Doug Chivas	Alfa Romeo 1750 GTV	E	0	DNF	DNF
1971	Ford Motor Co of Australia		Ford XY Falcon GT-HO Phase III	E	129	5th	4th
1972	(Australia) Bryan Byrt Ford Pty Ltd		Ford XY Falcon GT-HO Phase III	D	129	**2nd**	**1st**
1973	(Australia) Bryan Byrt Ford	(Australia) Bob Skelton	Ford XA Falcon GT Hardtop	D	91	DNF	DNF
1974	(Australia) John French Pty Ltd	(Australia) Dick Johnson	Alfa Romeo 2000 GTV	1301 – 2000cc	71	DNF	DNF
1978	(Australia) Bryan Byrt Ford	(Australia) Warwick Brown	Ford XC Falcon GS500 Hardtop	A	57	DNF	DNF
1979	(Australia) Thompson Ford	(Australia) Colin Bond	Ford XC Falcon GS500 Hardtop	A	23	DNF	DNF
1980	(Australia) Palmer Tube Mills	(Australia) Dick Johnson	Ford XD Falcon	3001-6000cc	17	DNF	DNF
1981	(Australia) Palmer Tube Mills	(Australia) Dick Johnson	Ford XD Falcon	8 Cylinder & Over	120	**1st**	**1st**
1982	(Australia) Palmer Tube Mills	(Australia) Dick Johnson	Ford XE Falcon	A	160	DSQ	DSQ
1983	Nissan Motor Co. Australia P/L	(Australia) Fred Gibson	Nissan Bluebird Turbo	A	134	22nd	20th
1984	(Australia) Palmer Tube Mills	(Australia) Dick Johnson	Ford XE Falcon	Group C	107	DNF	DNF
1984	(Australia) Palmer Tube Mills	(Australia) Dick Johnson	Ford Mustang GT	Group A	-	DNS	DNS
1985	(Australia) Alf Grant	(Australia) Alf Grant	Holden VK Commodore	C	0	DNF	DNF
1986	(Australia) Dulux Auto Colour	(Australia) Alf Grant	Holden VK Commodore SS Group A	C	11	DNF	DNF
1987	Ralliart Australia	(Australia) Gary Scott (Japan) Akihiko Nakaya	Mitsubishi Starion Turbo	1	154	5th (DND)*	4th (DND)*

* In 1987 French was listed to drive and qualified the #16 Ralliart Starion, but never got to drive in the race

Sporting positions
Preceded by Tony Roberts; Bob Watson	Winner of the Sandown 500; 1969 (with Allan Moffat)	Succeeded by Allan Moffat
Preceded by Peter Brock; Jim Richards	Winner of the Bathurst 1000; 1981 (with Dick Johnson)	Succeeded by Peter Brock; Larry Perkins
