= Chrysler Valiant Charger =

Australian muscle car

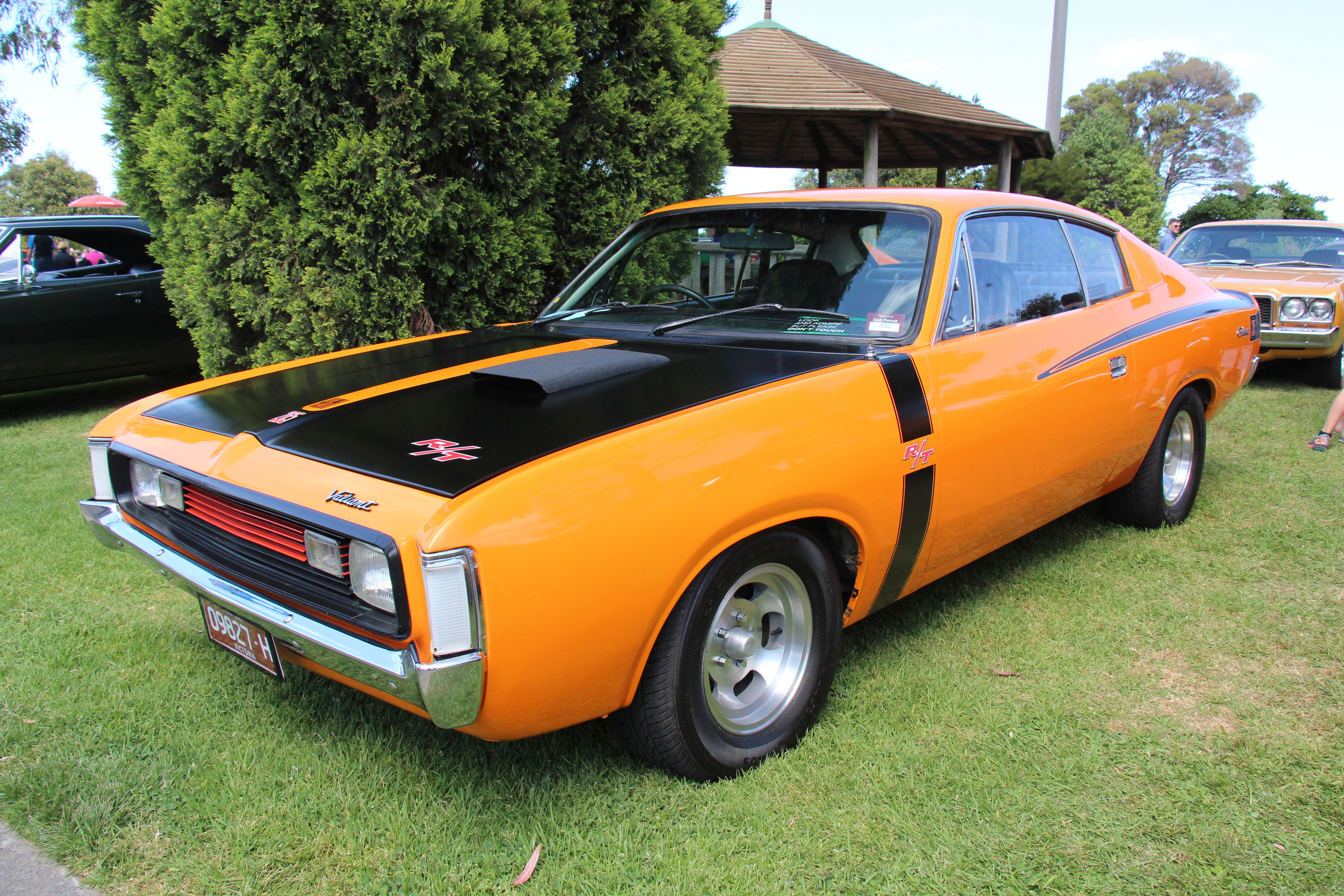
- Chrysler VH Valiant Charger R/T

Overview
- Manufacturer: Chrysler Australia
- Also called: Chrysler Charger (VK & CL series)
- Production: 1971–1978
- Designer: Bob Hubbach, Bryan Smyth (VH); Dennis Nicolle (VJ)

Body and chassis
- Class: Muscle car
- Body style: 2-door coupe
- Layout: FR layout
- Platform: A-body
- Related: Chrysler Valiant; Dodge Dart; Plymouth Valiant

The Chrysler Valiant Charger is a two-door hardtop coupe introduced by Chrysler Australia in 1971. It was a short wheelbase version of the concurrent Australian Chrysler Valiant sedan. Introduced within the VH Valiant series, it continued as a variant through the subsequent VJ, VK and CL series, until production ceased in 1978. It was marketed and badged as the Valiant Charger in the VH and VJ series and as the Chrysler Charger in the later VK and CL series.

While still based on the US Chrysler A-body platform, with virtually identical front suspension, the fenders were widened, and a wider rear axle fitted, so that the track, front and rear, was considerably wider than any US A-body, this also allowed wheels much wider than a US A-body. The Australian Chargers also used a 5-on-4.5" (5x114.3mm) wheel bolt circle (still 7/16" studs), while the US cars did not go to "big bolt pattern" until 1973.

The Charger was extraordinarily popular in Australia during the VH series. At one point Charger production totalled 80% of all Australian Valiant production.

The VH Valiant Charger achieved critical acclaim, winning the 1971 Australian Wheels Car of the Year Award. It was also popular in New Zealand where they were assembled from imported kits.

The sporty image of the Charger faded through the VJ range of cars and was neutered altogether by 1975 release of the VK series.

During the seven years of production, the Charger carried many variations of essentially two basic powerplants, based on the Chrysler Hemi-6 Engine and versions of the Chrysler LA engine V8.

== VH Valiant Charger ==
VH Valiant Charger
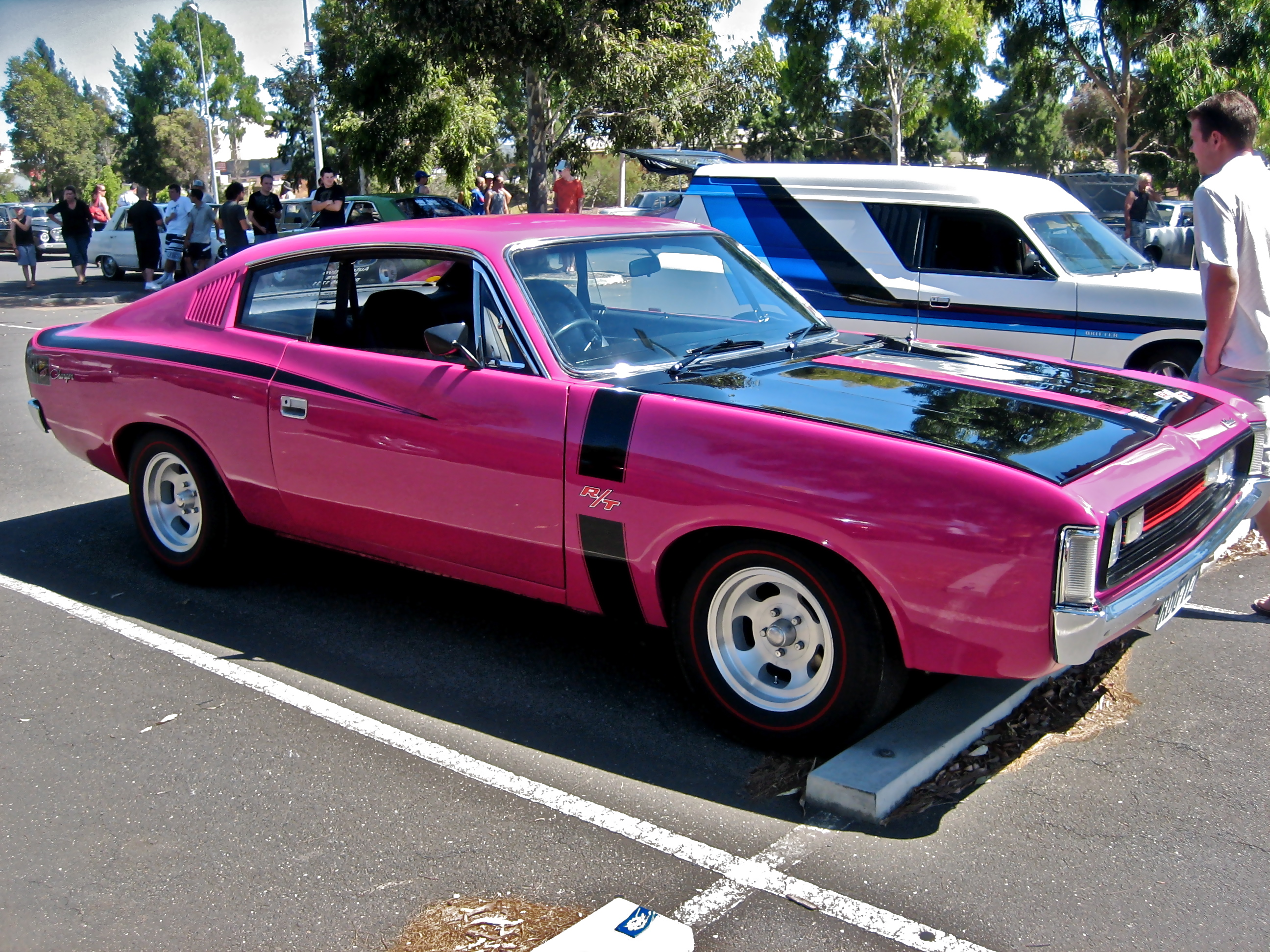
- Chrysler VH Valiant Charger R/T

Overview
- Production: 1971-1972
- Designer: Bob Hubbach

Dimensions
- Wheelbase: 2667 mm (105.0 inches)
- Length: 4564 mm (179.7 inches)
- Width: 1885 mm (74.2 inches)
- Height: 1384 mm (54.5 inches)

The Chrysler VH Valiant Charger range, introduced in 1971, consisted of Charger, Charger XL, Charger 770 and Charger R/T (Road/Track) models.

The R/T version carried on Chrysler's performance image from the VG series Valiant Pacer, and soon became the platform for Chrysler's participation in production car racing in Australia. The range of cars was broad-based to appeal to all manner of people:

- Charger: 215 cu in (3.5 L) base engine (140 bhp (100 kW), 3spd manual, $2795.00
- Charger XL: 245 cu in (4.0 L) base engine (160 bhp (120 kW), 3spd manual, $3195.00
- Charger R/T: 265 cu in (4.3 L) HP base engine (218 bhp (163 kW), 3spd manual, $3395.00
- Charger R/T E38: 265 cu in (4.3 L) HP base engine (280 bhp (210 kW), 3spd manual, $3975.00
- Charger R/T E49: 265 cu in (4.3 L) HP base engine (302 bhp (225 kW), 4spd manual, $3975.00
- Charger 770: 265 cu in (4.3 L) HP base engine (203 bhp (151 kW), 3spd automatic, $3625.00
- Charger 770: 318 cu in (5.2 L) 2bbl V8 engine (230 bhp (170 kW), 3spd automatic, $4105.00
- Charger 770 SE E55: 340 cu in (5.6 L) 4bbl V8 engine (275 bhp (205 kW), 3spd automatic, $4850.00

The Charger R/T option E37 featured a tuned "Six Pack" version of the engine characterised by triple sidedraught Weber carburettors, formed the basis of Chrysler's touring car racer for 1971. This engine could also be ordered as an option on all models

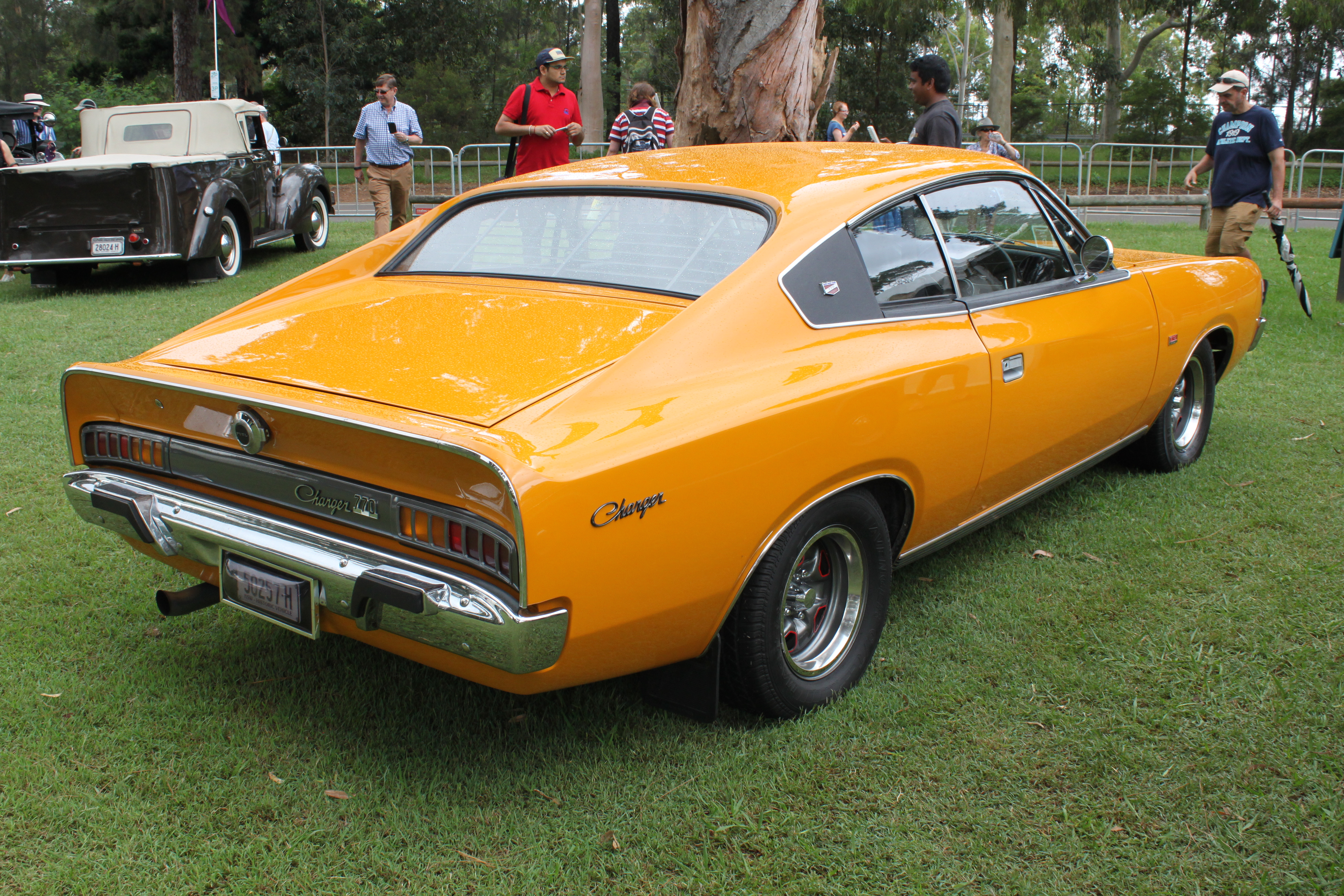
1972 Chrysler VH Valiant Charger 770

The Charger R/T E49 engine produced remarkable torque on a seven bearing configuration which enabled considerable power development previously unobtained from 6-cylinder engines and not surpassed until the Porsche Turbo 911 (300) release of 1975

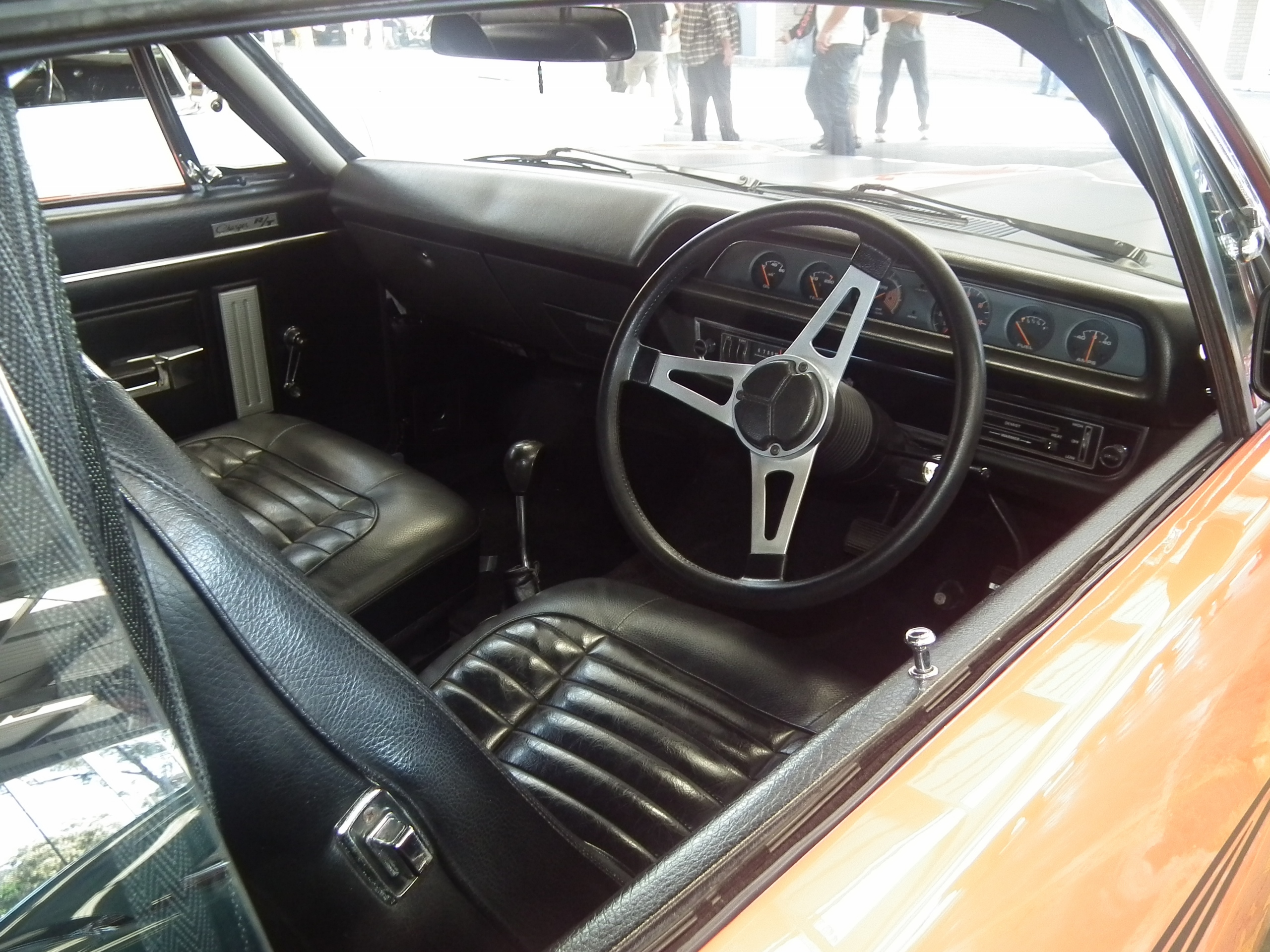
1971 Chrysler VH Valiant Charger R/T interior

The Charger 770 SE (Special Edition) featured the E55 option; which was the 340ci 4bbl V8 engine, many motoring journalists correctly reported at the time as being imported by Chrysler for an aborted racing touring car homologation exercise. Chrysler Racing Manager John Ellis stated at the time that a ute fitted with the 340ci V8 (and the same wheelbase as the R/T Charger) was track tested at the Mallala circuit in South Australia by racing driver Leo Geoghegan (and on local roads by Leo and his brother Ian), but was found to be 2–3 seconds slower around Mallala than the E49 (the heavier V8 at the front caused severe understeer and required earlier braking than the Hemi six). Despite the slower lap times at Mallala, it was expected that the extra power of the 340ci V8 would have worked better on the long straights and uphill runs at Bathurst where there were few heavy braking or tight corners. John Ellis then incorrectly stated that the 340ci engines were not imported for Bathurst and that an R/T 340 Charger was not being considered.

336 340ci engines plus 4 speed gear boxes were imported by Colin Adey under direct instructions from Chrysler Chief Engineer Walt McPherson. Chrysler General Manager David Brown and Walt McPherson had discussed the short comings of the E49 265ci and decided the 340ci was to be the next R/T Touring Car. This information never filtered down to John Ellis.

Due to bad press coverage at the time the 340ci program was aborted and Chrysler did the only thing it could do which was to recoup the cost outlay by selling the stocks of the imported 340ci engines. The engines were sold off in the upmarket 770 SE (Grand Tourer) Charger.

The SE was fitted with an imported 'Torqueflite' 727 transmission, Chrysler further watered down engine performance by using a single pipe exhaust system. Apart from its unique engine, the Charger 770 SE featured other signature details such as combination black and white vinyl trim and one with single colour Maroon vinyl trim, turned metal dash facia, and it was only available in three body colours, namely Vintage Red (Bright Red), Limelight (green), and Sunfire (yellow metallic). Production records indicate that Chrysler manufactured a total of 125 VH Valiant Charger 770 SE cars, two of which varied from standard specification in being painted White and one Deep Maroon.

== VJ Valiant Charger ==
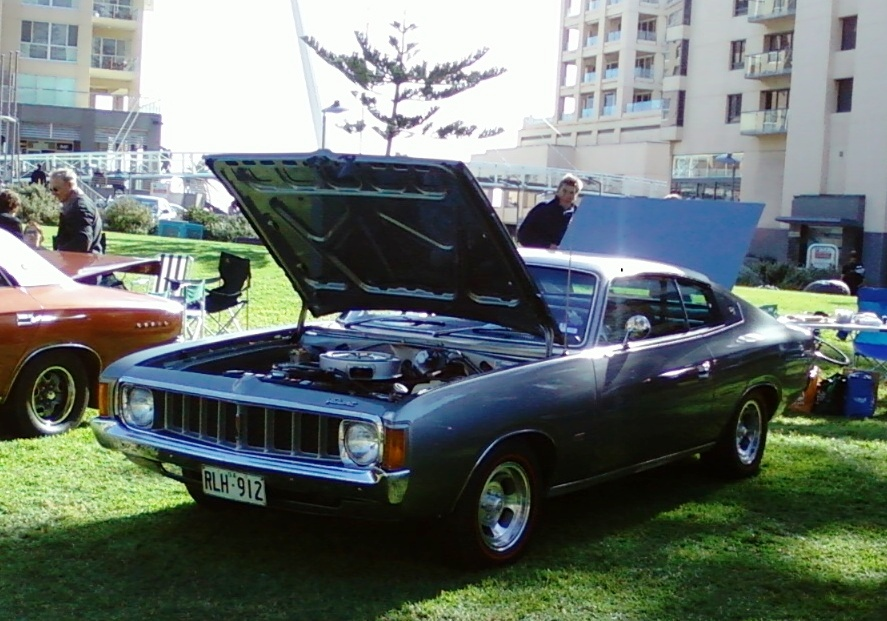
Chrysler VJ Valiant Charger 770 (with Option E55)

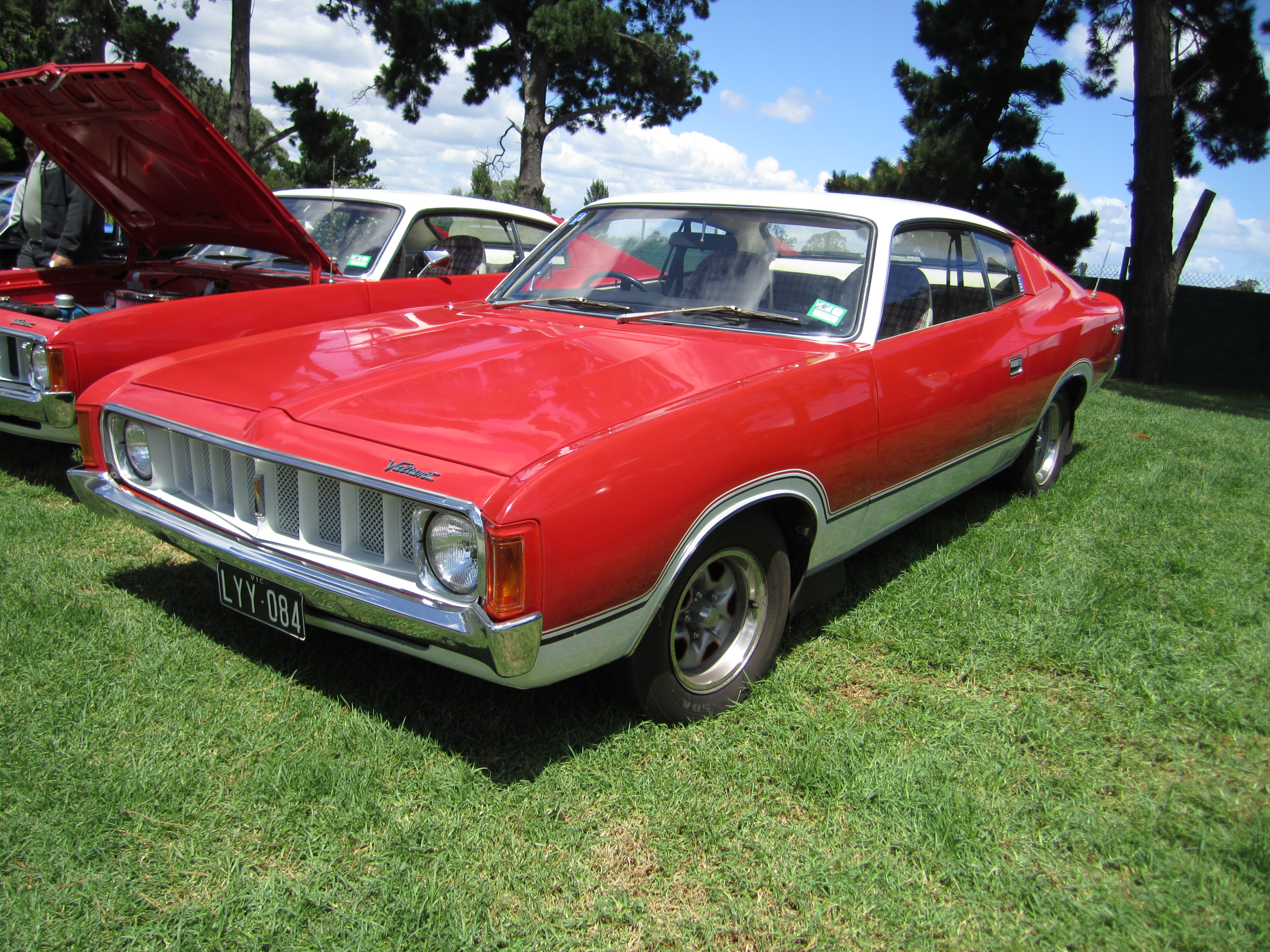
Chrysler VJ Valiant Charger Sportsman

In March 1973 the VH range was superseded by the VJ series. The VJ featured changes to the cowl, grille, lighting and rear quarter feature panel, with notably 7" round headlights replacing the previous rectangular units. Significantly, bar four VJs built as E49s, this new model range saw the end of the Charger R/T, which pretty much coincided with Chrysler having officially withdrawn from participation in Australian touring car racing at the end of the 1972 season. However, the essential elements of the Six Pack E37 engine option were carried over into the VJ series, now referred to as the E48 engine option.

- option E48: Street tune "Six Pack" 265 cu in (4.3 L) engine with three two-barrel Weber carburettors and four-speed manual gearbox.
- option E55: 4bbl 275 bhp (205 kW) 340 cu in (5.6 L) V8 (1.88" valve heads).
- option E57: 2bbl 255 bhp (190 kW) 360 cu in (5.9 L) V8 (introduced late 1974 to replace E55 option)
- option A23: VJ Charger Sportsman

VJ Charger 770 (with option E55) When specified with the E55 340ci V8 engine option, such VJ-series cars were no longer tagged as a special edition Charger 770 "SE". This meant that a variety of colour and trim combinations are featured in E55 optioned VJ Chargers such that the only external distinguishing features were the "340 4BBL" badges on the front guards. Most, but not all, of the VJ-series E55 option cars also featured the W35 option seven inch wide alloy wheels that were a signature item for all prior E38, E49, and E55 option VH-series Chargers.

There was an improvement to the motor in this model, as opposed to the previous VH-series. The introduction of "Electronic Ignition" replaced the use of points ignition. This greatly improved the car for normal use making cold starts easier, and no longer requiring the ignition to be tuned every 10,000 km or so.

The Carter ThermoQuad was used in this series as well, however not from the start, or at least not all the cars left the factory with one. Some still had the previous models AVS carburettor. When the carburettor change was implemented is unknown, with some examples having the Thermoquad and later builds still keeping the AVS. There is considered to be an improvement to engine performance as the flow in the carburettor was increased from 625 cfm to 800 cfm for the Thermoquad.

During this option's life, there were other engine variations, e.g. the motors also had a change in the cylinder heads. According to the service manuals, early VJ models maintained heads with 2.02" inlet valves, whereas later heads had a decrease in inlet valve size which saw a reduction to 1.88", again, when this was implemented is not truly known and some early build cars have the smaller valves whereas some later builds have the larger valves.

It seems that most E55 versions of the VJ Charger were manufactured during the latter half of 1973. When remaining stocks of the 340 cu in (5.6 L) V8 depleted, Chrysler ceased manufacturing cars with option E55 and in late 1974 extended availability of the lazy 360 cu in (5.9 L) V8 (from the prestige Chrysler by Chrysler sedan) to the Charger 770 by way of option E57.

VJ Charger Sportsman (option A23) In August 1974, a limited edition Charger Sportsman was released, based upon the Charger XL. Built to a quantity of 500 units, all Sportsman cars were painted an exclusive combination of Vintage Red and white, with a combination black and white interior featuring specific cloth trim. These cars were powered by the standard 265ci engine and four speed manual transmission.

== VK Charger ==
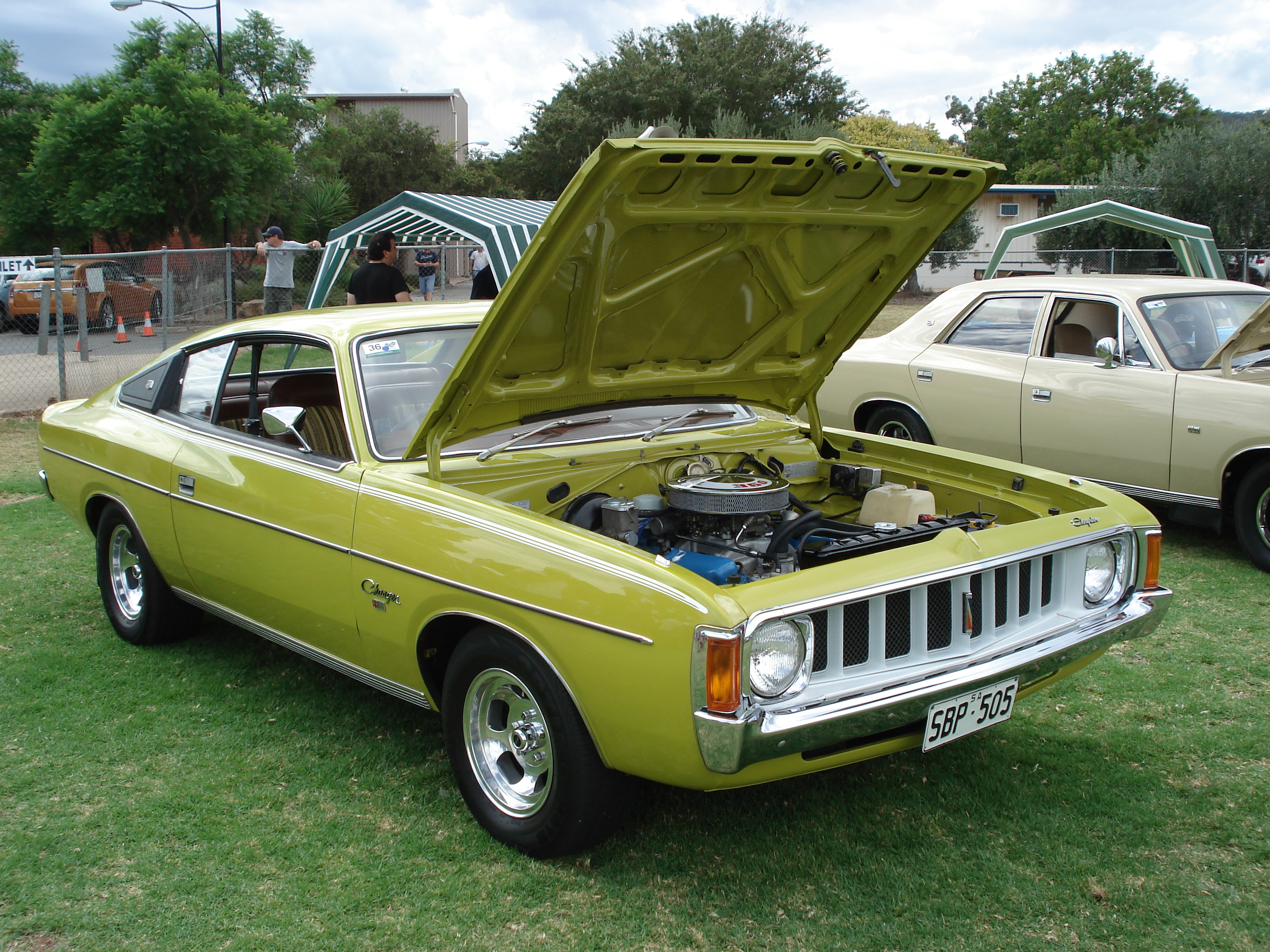
Chrysler VK Charger 770

The mildly revised VK series Charger was released in October 1975 in only two variants:

- Charger XL: 3.5 L (213.6 cu in), 3spd manual (4 L (244.1 cu in) and 4.3 L (262.4 cu in)litre engine options)
- Charger 770: 4 L (244.1 cu in), 3spd manual (4.3 L (262.4 cu in), 5.2 L (317.3 cu in) V8 and 5.9 L (360.0 cu in) V8 engine options)

The introduction of the VK series saw the demise of the "Six Pack" engine E48 option package, such that only a basic specification 4.3 L (262.4 cu in) engine remained.

The Charger was now marketed as the Chrysler Charger rather than as the Chrysler Valiant Charger with Chrysler script badging having replaced Valiant badging front and rear. Some further changes with the VK model included 'white-out' grille treatment, revised rear light clusters, and revised 'C' pillar ornamentation utilising extended fibreglass panels in black, incorporating XL or 770 badge identification. Inside, wiper and windscreen washer controls were now integrated into the indicator stalk and there were also some trim revisions that included bold Boca-Raton cloth seat inserts for the Charger 770.

In June 1976, ADR 27A (an updated emissions regulation) was implemented for all Australian market motor vehicles, which resulted in both the 3.5 L (213.6 cu in) engine and the 5.9 L (360.0 cu in) V8 engine being dropped from all relevant vehicles in Chrysler's VK series range.

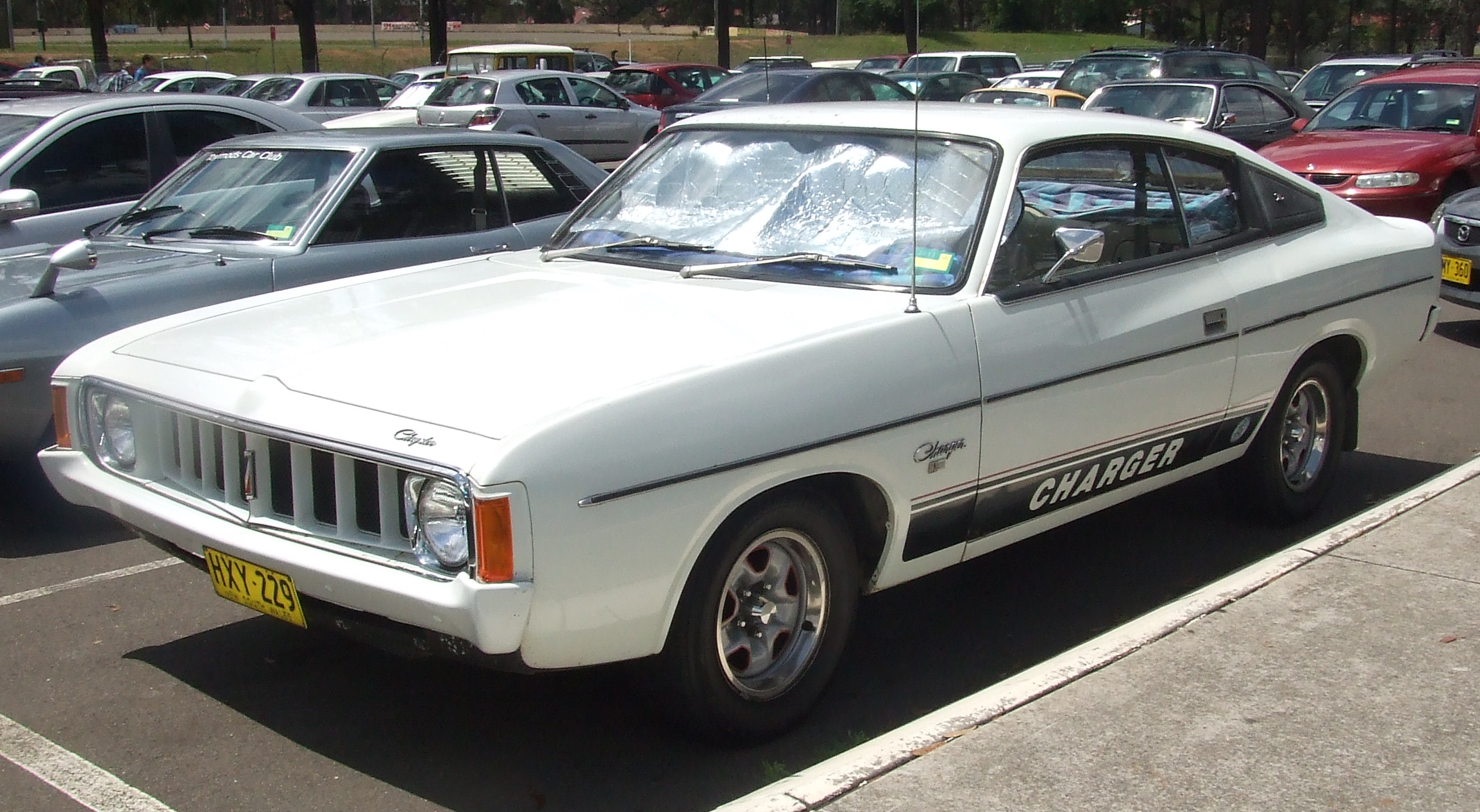
White Knight Special

VK Charger White Knight Special (option A50): Following July 1976, Chrysler released 200 limited edition Charger XL cars that were principally a cosmetic treatment inside and out, and featuring a front body spoiler. Half of the production run were painted Arctic White and the other half were painted Amarante Red, with bumpers and grille painted to match. These cars featured the 4.3 L (262.4 cu in) six-cylinder engine, with a choice of manual or automatic transmission, and interiors were trimmed to a specific combination of white vinyl with red accents.

== CL Charger ==
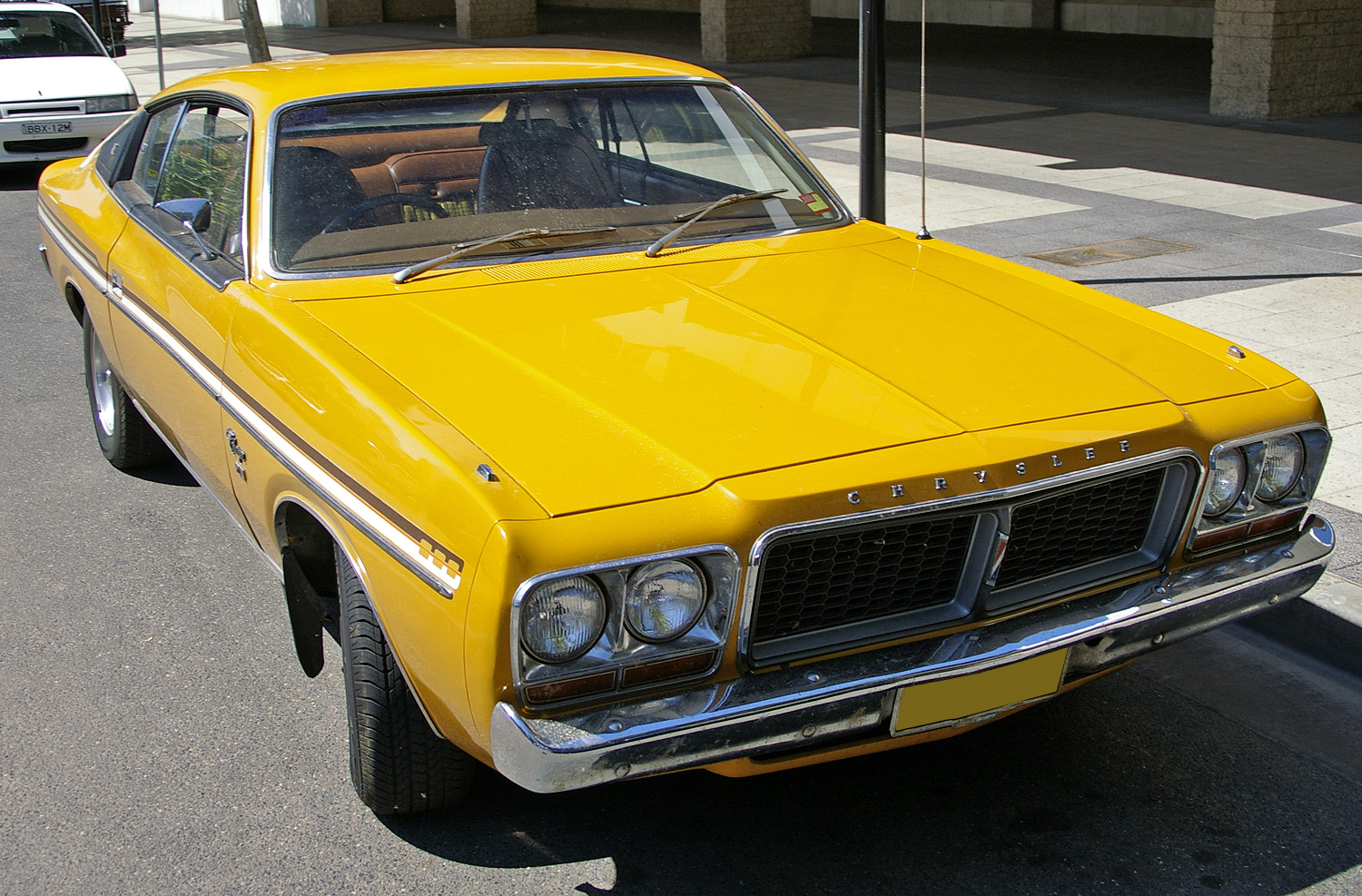
Chrysler CL Charger 770

The CL series Charger was introduced in late October 1976 and was the last Charger model made in Australia, it featured new front bodywork and was expected to be designated as the VL series, but Chrysler decided to rename it CL to reflect the corporate Chrysler name which was now being applied over the whole range of cars sold in Australia.

The Charger XL variant was deleted (except for police duties) such that the CL series offered only the Charger 770 for public sale.

CL Charger Drifter (A34, A49 options): Late in the life of the CL Charger, Chrysler introduced the Drifter Pack option which was made available in four body colour choices, namely Spinnaker White (A34), Impact Orange (A49), Sundance Yellow (A49), and Harvest Gold (A49). This was basically a cosmetic option inspired by features found on the Chrysler Drifter panel van. These cars were available in a choice of 4.3 L (262.4 cu in) or 5.2 L (317.3 cu in) engines, but only with 4-speed manual transmission.

Chrysler's manufacturing production of the Charger ceased on 16 August 1978.

== Motorsport ==
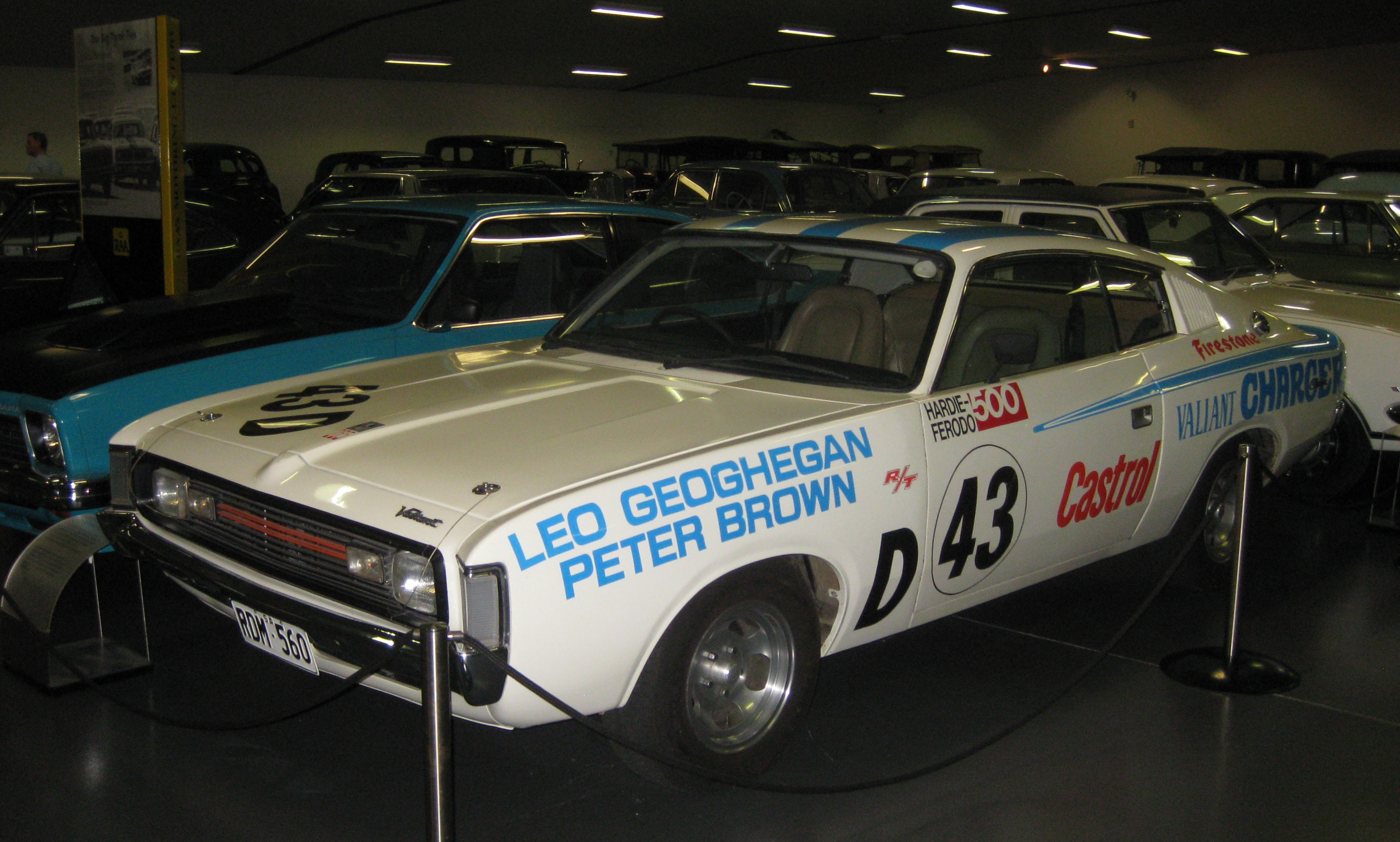
Leo Geoghegan's Chrysler VH Valiant Charger.

The Valiant Charger was raced in Australia in an official capacity during 1971 and 1972, with most effort concentrated upon the series and the annual Bathurst 500 mile touring car event. Chrysler Australia employed the services of racing driver Leo Geoghegan to assist in the development of the Charger as a touring car racer. The Charger won the first race in which it was entered, the Toby Lee 100 at Oran Park, driven by Doug Chivas. In the 1972 Hardie-Ferodo 500 at Bathurst, a VH Charger R/T E49 driven by Doug Chivas placed third outright behind a Ford XY Falcon GTHO and a Holden Torana GTR XU-1. They were comprehensively beaten by the XY Falcon GTHO, lapping some 6 seconds per lap slower due to brake pad issues.

In New Zealand, where the touring car rules were less open, the Charger proved to be unbeatable from 1971 through to 1979 at the famous B&H 500 mile (later 1000 km) series held at Pukekohe Park Raceway. The most successful of New Zealand drivers were Leo Leonard and Jim Little.

Allan Moffat, driving the Ford XY Falcon GTHO, was comprehensively beaten by the Charger in New Zealand. Moffat proclaimed the winning car as "The Fastest Charger in the World".
