= National Motor Racing Museum =

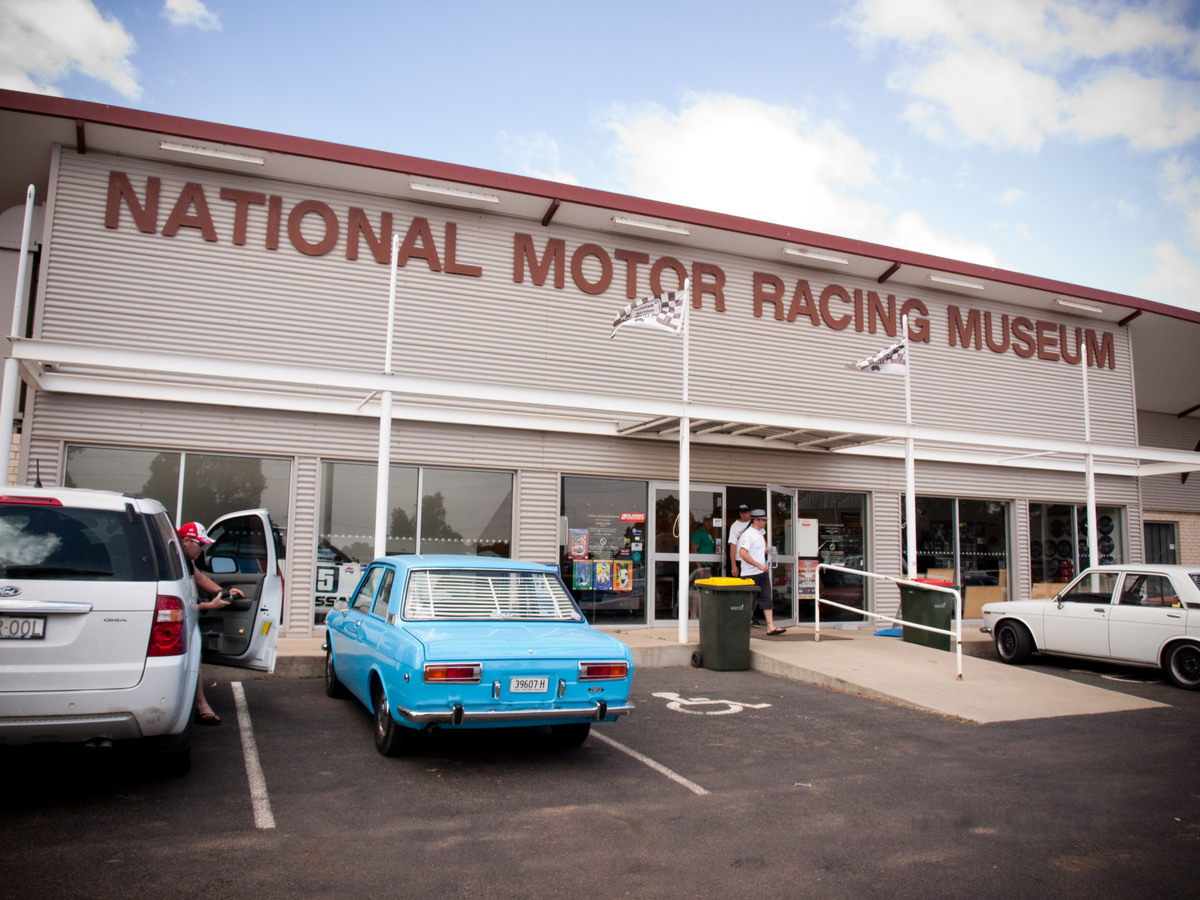
- Location: Mount Panorama, Bathurst
- Coordinates: 33°26′24″S 149°33′43″E
- Type: Motor racing museum
- Website: National Motor Racing Museum

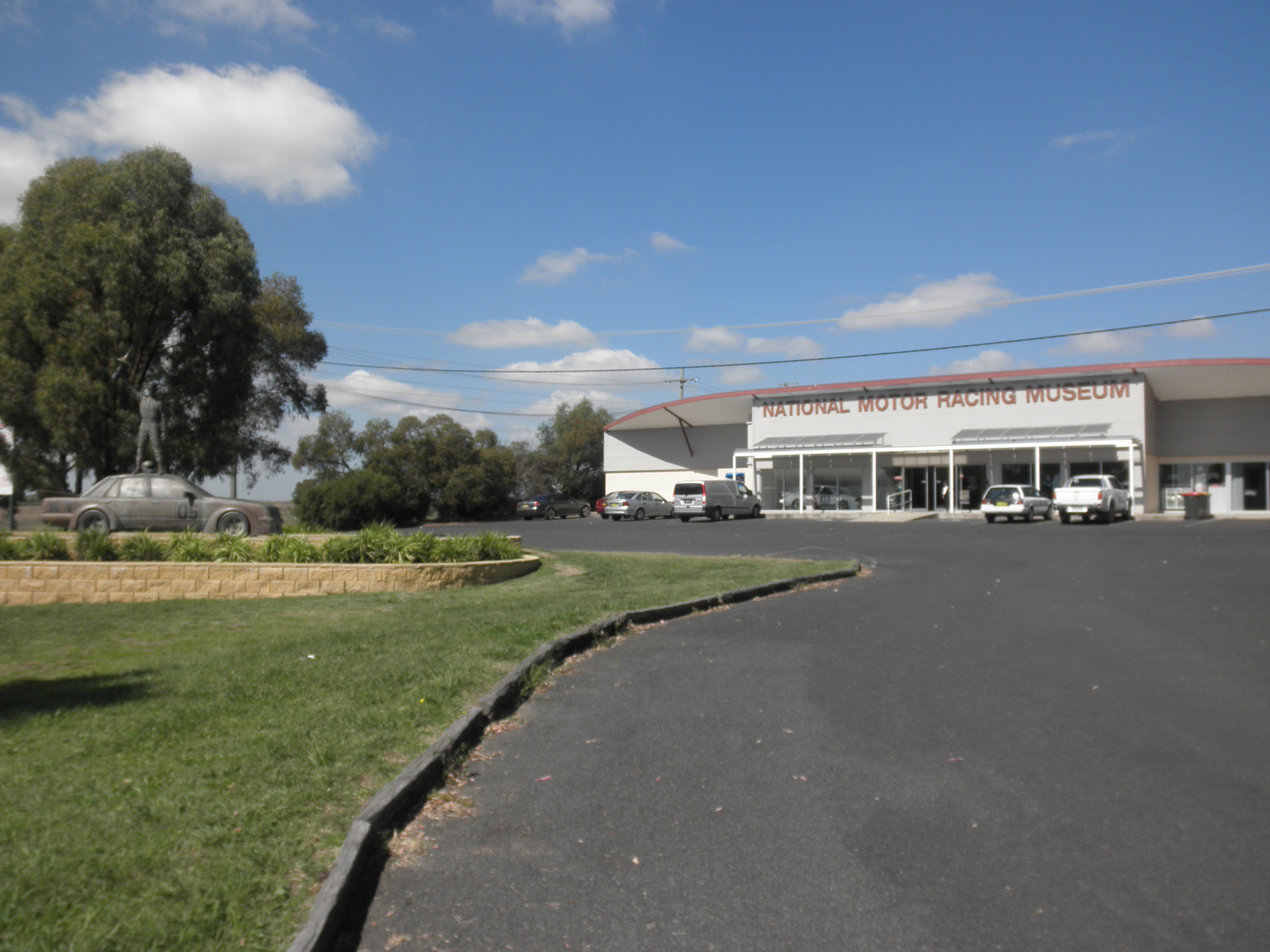
National Motor Racing Museum, Bathurst

The National Motor Racing Museum (NMRM) is located in Bathurst, New South Wales, Australia. The museum is situated adjacent to the Mount Panorama motor racing circuit at the end of Conrod Straight.

The museum's purpose is to display and preserve material relevant to Australia's motor racing history. It exhibits some of Australia's famous modern racing cars, motorcycles and other memorabilia.

== Memorial ==
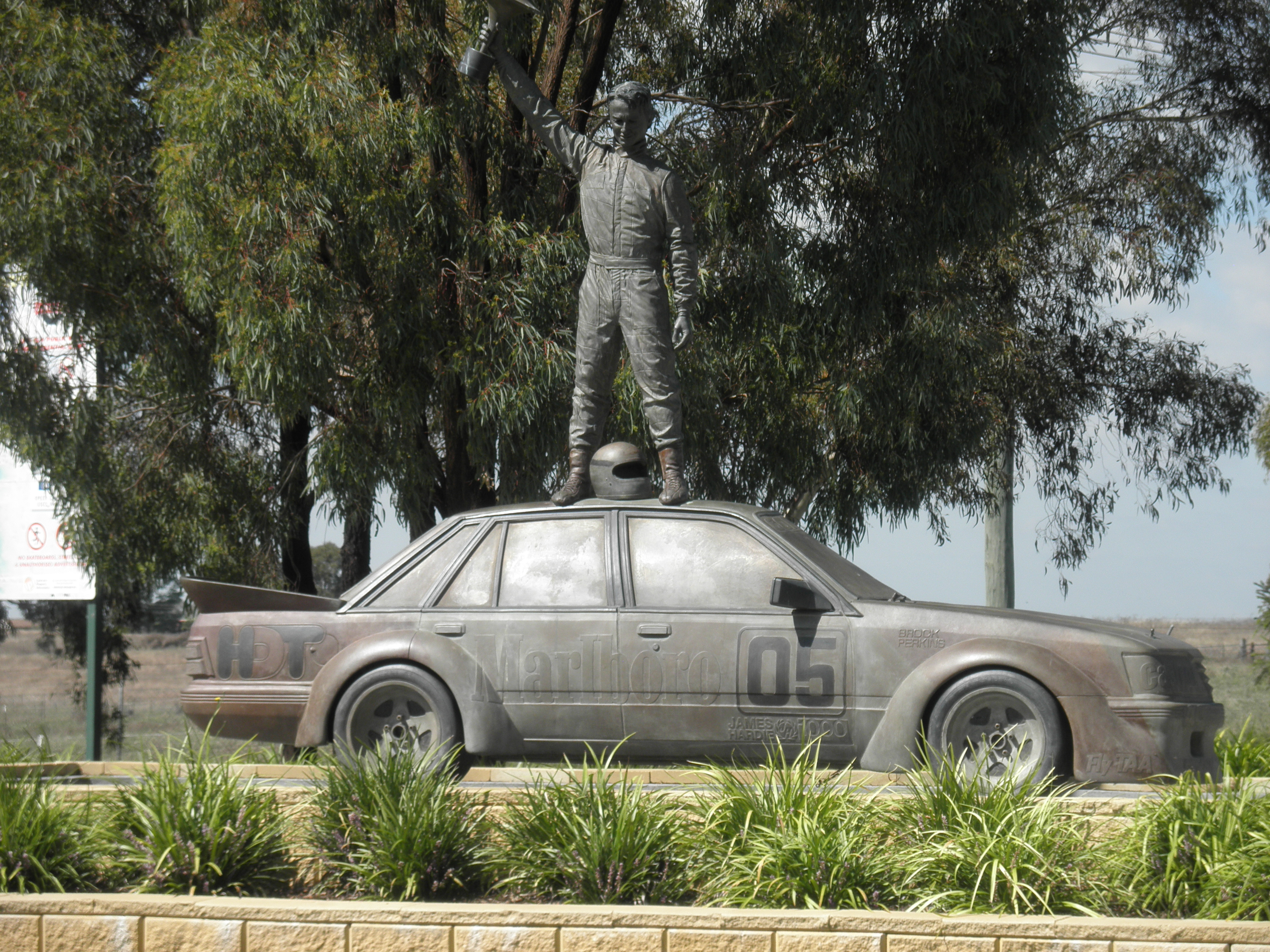
Peter Brock memorial

At the front of the museum is a memorial to Peter Brock who won the Bathurst 1000 nine times, he died in the Targa West rally event in September 2006. Sculptor Julie Squires created the memorial which depicts Brock standing atop a 1984 Holden Commodore VK, the car he drove at the 1984 Bathurst 1000.

== Exhibits ==
Vehicles in the permanent collection include:

- Ford Falcon XC driven to victory in the 1977 Bathurst 1000 by Allan Moffat and Jacky Ickx.
- Holden Commodore VK driven to victory in the 1984 Bathurst 1000 by Peter Brock and Larry Perkins - The last Group C Bathurst 1000.
- Holden LH Torana SL/R 5000 L34 driven to victory in the 1976 Bathurst 1000 by Bob Morris and John Fitzpatrick.
- Ford Cortina GT500 driven to victory in the 1965 Armstrong 500 by Barry Seton and Midge Bosworth.
- Replica of the Ford XR Falcon GT driven to victory in the 1967 Gallaher 500 by Harry Firth and Fred Gibson. - The first V8 powered car to win the Bathurst race.
- Ford Sierra RS500 driven to victory in the 1988 Bathurst 1000 by Tony Longhurst and Tomas Mezera - The first official Bathurst 1000 victory by a turbocharged car.
- Nissan Bluebird Turbo driven by George Fury to pole position for the 1984 Bathurst 1000 - The fastest touring car to lap the old 6.172 km long circuit with a time of 2:13.85 and the first turbocharged car to claim pole position.
- Holden Monaro 427C driven to victory in the 2002 Bathurst 24 Hour by Garth Tander, Steven Richards, Cameron McConville and Nathan Pretty - The first of two Bathurst 24 Hour races run and the debut race of the controversial 7.0L Monaro.
