= Sun-7 Chesterfield Series =

- Category: Touring car racing
- Country: Australia
- Inaugural season: 1971
- Folded: 1981
- Last Drivers' champion: (Australia) Steve Masterton

The Sun-7 Chesterfield Series was an Australian touring car racing series staged at Amaroo Park in Sydney, New South Wales from 1971 to 1981. The actual series name varied from year to year, according to the commercial sponsorship secured by the series promoters, the Australian Racing Drivers Club.

Initially run for Group E Series Production Touring Cars the series switched to the new Australian Group C Touring Car regulations in 1973. The series was a precursor to the later AMSCAR touring car series which was run at Amaroo Park from 1982.

== History ==
In 1971 Lakis Manticas won the inaugural "Sun-7" title driving a Morris Cooper S, with points being allocated evenly among the three engine capacity classes.

The tight Amaroo Park circuit suited the Holden Torana GTR XU-1s. Leading Sydney-based Torana drivers, such as the Holden Dealer Team's Colin Bond, Bob Morris, Don Holland and Allan Grice were prominent in the series. John Goss in the McLeod Ford entered Ford Falcon GT and Ford stalwart Fred Gibson were regular front-runners, while Chrysler drivers Leo Geoghegan and Doug Chivas also appeared. Colin Bond won the series three times in a row, from 1972 to 1974.

For 1975 the Sun-7 Rothmans Series was restricted to cars with an engine capacity of under 3 litres, meaning that larger engined cars such as the Holden Torana SL/R 5000 and Ford Falcon GT could no longer compete. In the 3 litre era some of the main contenders included Bo Seton's Ford Capri, Don Holland and Allan Grice in Mazda RX-3's and Bob Morris in a Triumph Dolomite.

For the 1981 series the engine capacity limit of the competing cars was increased from 3.0 litres to 3.5 litres and the following year the 3.5 litre capacity limit was removed for what was now entitled the AMSCAR.

== Winners ==
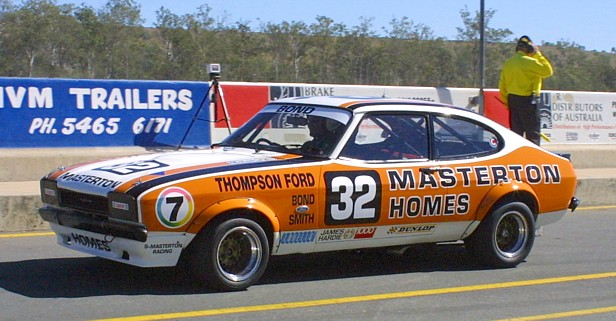
Colin Bond placed third in the 1981 Better Brakes 3.5 Litre Series in a Ford Capri. The car is pictured in 2005

Year	Series name	Driver	Car	Team
1971	Sun-7 Series	(Australia) Lakis Manticas	Morris Cooper S	British Leyland Works Team
1972	Sun-7 Series	(Australia) Colin Bond	Holden LJ Torana GTR XU-1	Holden Dealer Team
1973	Sun 7 Better Brakes Gold Medal Series	(Australia) Colin Bond	Holden LJ Torana GTR XU-1	Holden Dealer Team
1974	Sun-7 Chesterfield Series	(Australia) Colin Bond	Holden LJ Torana GTR XU-1; Holden LH Torana SL/R 5000 ]	Holden Dealer Team
1975	Sun-7 Rothmans Series	(Australia) Barry Seton	Ford Capri GT 3000 Mk.I	
1976	Rothmans Sun-7 Series	(Australia) Allan Grice	Mazda RX-3	Mazda House Racing
1977	Sun-7 Rothmans Touring Car Series	(Australia) Barry Seton	Ford Capri V6	
1978	Rothmans Sun-7 Series	(Australia) Peter Williamson	Toyota Celica	
1979	Better Brakes Under 3 Litre Series	(Australia) Barry Seton	Ford Capri	
1980	Better Brakes Touring Car Series	(Australia) Barry Seton	Ford Capri	
1981	Better Brakes 3.5 Litre Series	(Australia) Steve Masterton	Ford Capri V6	

== Multiple winners ==
=== By driver ===
Wins	Driver	Years
4	(Australia) Barry Seton	1975, 1977, 1979, 1980
3	(Australia) Colin Bond	1972, 1973, 1974

=== By manufacturer ===
Wins	Manufacturer
5	Ford
3	Holden
