= 1965 Armstrong 500 =

Motor race in Australia

Seasons
- ← 1964 1966 →

Layout of the Mount Panorama Circuit (1938–1986)

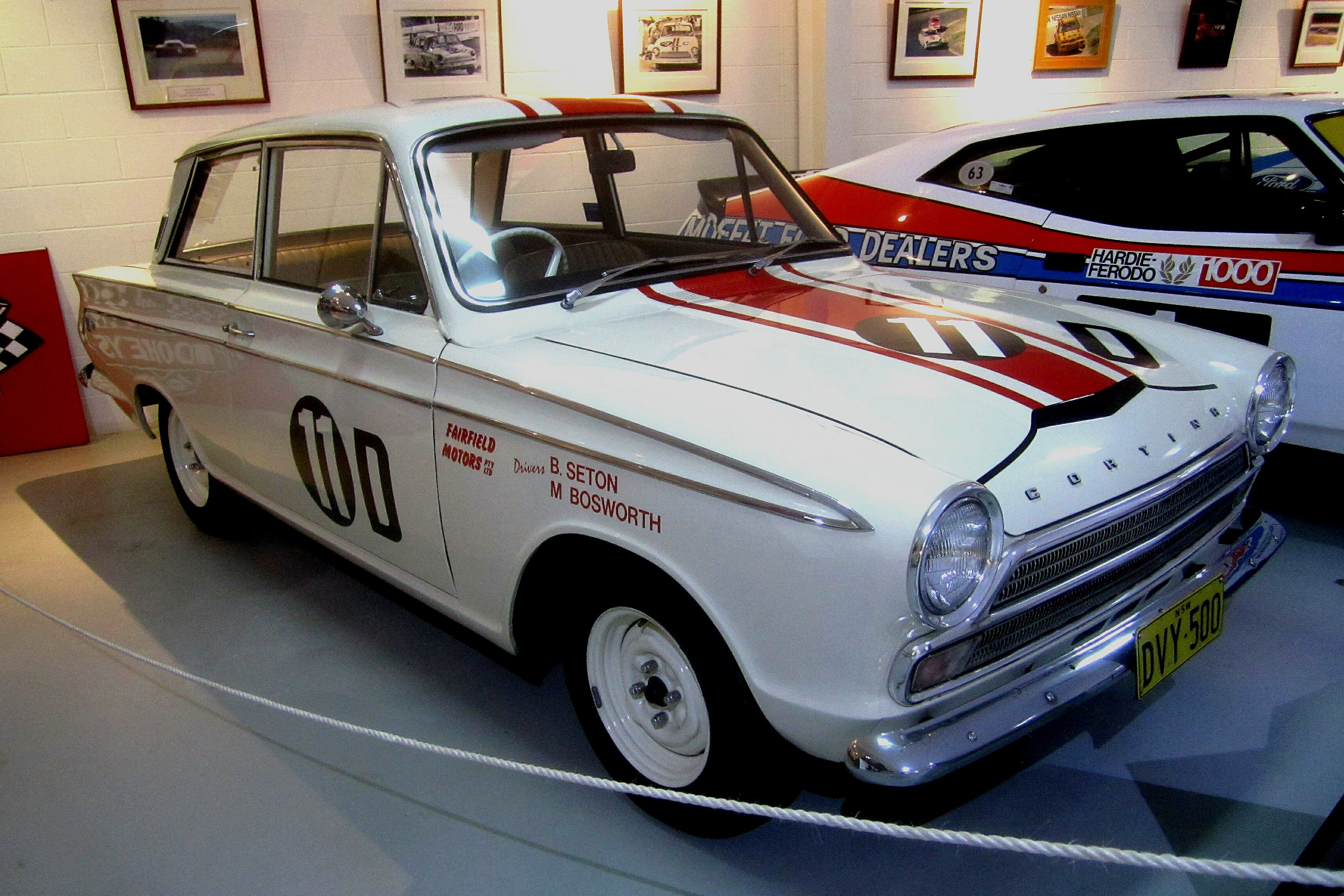
The winning Ford Cortina GT500 of Seton & Bosworth

The 1965 Armstrong 500 was the sixth running of the Bathurst 500 touring car race. It was held on 3 October 1965 at the Mount Panorama Circuit just outside Bathurst, New South Wales, Australia. The race was open to Australian assembled or manufactured vehicles and, for the first time, to imported vehicles, of which at least 100 examples and 250 examples respectively had been registered in Australia. Cars competed in four classes based on the purchase price of the vehicle in Australian pounds. Prize money was on offer only for class placings however the Armstrong Trophy was presented to the entrant of the outright winning car, this being the first time in the history of the event that there had been an official award for the outright winner.

The outright winning car was the Ford Cortina Mk.I GT500 entered by Fairfield Motors and driven by Barry Seton and emerging young driver Midge Bosworth. Second was the Grawill Motors entered Cortina driven mainly by Bruce McPhee with one lap driven by Barry Mulholland. Third, and one lap behind the two Cortina was the factory entered Morris Cooper S of Brian Foley and Peter Manton.

== Class structure ==
=== Class A ===
Class A was for cars under £920. It was contested by Datsun Bluebird, Fiat 850, 1.5 litre Ford Cortina 220, Morris Mini de Luxe and Vauxhall Viva, although all the Datsuns were withdrawn prior to race start due to wheel cracking failures.

=== Class B ===
The £921 to £1,020 class featured 1.5 litre Ford Cortina 240, Isuzu Bellett, Morris Cooper, Renault R8 and Toyota Corona.

=== Class C ===
The £1,021 to £1,300 class was dominated by the Morris Cooper S, but also contained Chrysler Valiant, Ford Cortina GT and Holden HD X2.

=== Class D ===
The £1,301 to £2,000 class featured the first of what came to be known as the 'Bathurst specials', the Ford Cortina GT500 named for the race. The class also contained Fiat 2300, Humber Vogue, Studebaker Lark, Triumph 2000 and Volvo 122.

== Results ==
Pos	Class	Class pos	No	Entrant	Drivers	Car	Laps
1	D	1	11	Fairfield Motors Pty Ltd	(Australia) Barry Seton (Australia) Midge Bosworth	Ford Cortina Mk.I GT500	130
2	D	2	4	Grawill Motors Pty Ltd	(Australia) Bruce McPhee (Australia) Barry Mulholland	Ford Cortina Mk.I GT500	130
3	C	1	29	BMC Australia	(Australia) Brian Foley (Australia) Peter Manton	Morris Cooper S	129
4	C	2	21	L and D Motors Pty Ltd	(Australia) Lindsay Little (Australia) Stan Pomroy	Morris Cooper S	129
5	D	3	12	Hunt Bros. (Sydney) Motors Pty Ltd	(Australia) Jack Murray (Australia) Bill McLachlan	Ford Cortina Mk.I GT500	128
6	C	3	30	BMC Australia	(United Kingdom) Paddy Hopkirk (Finland) Timo Mäkinen	Morris Cooper S	128
7	C	4	18	Marque Motors	(Australia) Bill Stanley (Australia) Ralph Sach	Morris Cooper S	128
8	C	5	19	College Auto Parts	(Australia) Ray Kaleda (Australia) Graham Moore	Morris Cooper S	125
9	C	6	24	Killara Motor Garage	(Australia) Greg Cusack (Australia) Bob Holden	Morris Cooper S	125
10	D	4	7	Australian Motor Industries	(Australia) Max Stewart (Australia) Bob Young	Triumph 2000	124
11	C	7	26	Ford Motor Company of Australia	(Australia) Barry Arentz (Australia) Geoff Russell	Ford Cortina Mk.I GT	124
12	D	5	3	British & Continental Cars P/L	(Australia) Bill Ford (Australia) Des West	Volvo 122S	121
13	D	6	2	Continental & General Distributors Pty Ltd	(Australia) Fred Sutherland (Australia) Allan Mottram	Studebaker Lark	120
14	A	1	45	Ford Motor Company of Australia	(Australia) Harry Firth (Australia) John Reaburn	Ford Cortina Mk.I 220	119
15	A	2	54	Ray Morris Motors Pty Ltd	(Australia) Bruce Maher (Australia) Ray Morris	Ford Cortina Mk.I 220	119
16	D	7	5	British & Continental Cars P/L	(Australia) Graham Ward (Australia) Barry Collerson	Volvo 122S	118
17	B	1	40	Ford Motor Company of Australia	(Australia) Glyn Scott (Australia) Max Volkers	Ford Cortina Mk.I 240	118
18	B	2	39	Australian Motor Industries	(Australia) Brian Reed (Australia) Des Kelly	Toyota Corona	118
19	A	3	53	H and G Taylor	(Australia) John Hall (Australia) Herb Taylor	Ford Cortina Mk.I 220	118
20	B	3	41	Australian Motor Industries	(Australia) Bill Buckle (Australia) Neil McKay	Toyota Corona	117
21	C	8	22	Advanx (Gosford) Motor Service	(Australia) Alton Boddenberg (Australia) Digby Cooke	Chrysler Valiant	116
22	C	9	31	Smith Auto Accessories Pty Ltd	(Australia) Don Smith (Australia) Bruce Stewart	Holden HD X2	116
23	B	4	36	Australian Motor Industries	(Australia) Brian Sampson (Australia) Ern Abbott	Toyota Corona	116
24	B	5	42	BMC Australia	(Australia) Barry Ferguson (Australia) Charlie Smith	Morris Cooper	115
25	A	4	43	Griffith Barke Service	(Australia) Ken Harrison (Australia) Bruce Hodgson	Ford Cortina Mk.I 220	114
26	A	5	52	G. Shoesmith	(Australia) Gary Shoesmith (Australia) Tony Robards	Vauxhall Viva	113
27	D	8	10	Needham Motors Pty Ltd	(Australia) Warren Weldon (Australia) Bill Slattery	Studebaker Lark	112
28	A	6	55	BMC Australia	(Australia) Kevin Bartlett (Australia) Ron Haylen	Morris Mini de Luxe	111
29	A	7	47	Bamar Engineering	(Australia) John Marchiori (Australia) Arnold Ahrenfeld	Ford Cortina Mk.I 220	111
30	B	6	32	John Rhodin Pty Ltd	(Australia) Arthur Treloar (Australia) Colin Bond	Isuzu Bellett 1500	109
31	A	8	50	Vaughan and Lane Pty Ltd	(Australia) P. Taylor (Australia) T. Egan	Morris Mini de Luxe	109
32	B	7	34	Rex Emmett	(Australia) John Connolly (Australia) Rex Emmett	Renault R8	108
33	A	9	49	W and N Howes	(Australia) Bill Daly (Australia) Ray Heffernan	Fiat 850	106
34	D	9	6	Canberra Speed Shop	(Australia) Peter Brown (Australia) Ray Gulson	Ford Cortina Mk.I GT500	106
35	A	10	44	BMC Australia	(Australia) Steve Harvey (Australia) Laurie Stewart	Morris Mini de Luxe	105
36	B	8	37	Vaughan and Lane Pty Ltd	(Australia) Peter Cray (Australia) Don Holland	Morris Cooper	99
37	D	10	13	R. Salter	(Australia) Bob Salter (Australia) Ken Wiggins	Ford Cortina Mk.I GT500	94
38	C	10	28	Toowong Motors-J. Thomas and Sons	(Australia) Evan Thomas (Australia) Lionel Williams	Holden HD X2	84
39	B	9	35	Vern Potts BMC	(Australia) George Forrest (Australia) Frank Hann	Morris Cooper	81
40	D	11	8	D. Walker	(Australia) Carl Kennedy (Australia) David Walker	Ford Cortina Mk.I GT500	64
DNF	D		23	Alex Strachan Motors	(Australia) Bill Barnett (Australia) Don Johnston	Humber Vogue	106
DNF	D		16	Otten Motors	(Australia) Fred Otten (Australia) Mick Crampton	Fiat 2300	65
DNF	D		9	K. Russell	(Australia) Keith Russell (Australia) Colin Wear	Triumph 2000	60
DNF	D		14	Ford Motor Company of Australia	(Australia) Bob Jane (Australia) George Reynolds	Ford Cortina Mk.I GT500	58
DNF	D		15	Belvedere Motors	(Australia) Ron Hodgson (Australia) Bob Beasley	Ford Cortina Mk.I GT500	54
DNF	A		56	W. Burns	(Australia) Bill Burns (Australia) Brian Lawler	Fiat 850	54
DNF	A		58	T. Kavanagh	(Australia) Don Mudd (Australia) Tony Kavanagh	Vauxhall Viva	48
DNF	B		38	Renno Motors	(Australia) Brian McGrath (Australia) David Frazer	Renault R8	42
DNF	B		33	M. Martin	(Australia) Ron Clarke (Australia) John Prisk	Morris Cooper	25
DNF	C		25	BMC Australia	(Australia) John French (Australia) John Harvey	Morris Cooper S	24
DNF	D		17	A. Davis	(Australia) Arthur Davis (Australia) Paul Mander	Ford Cortina Mk.I GT500	14
DNF	C		20	Vaughan and Lane Pty Ltd	(Australia) Ian Cook (Australia) Ken Lindsay	Morris Cooper S	11
DNF	C		27	Vaughan and Lane Pty Ltd	(Australia) Doug Chivas (Australia) Phil Barnes	Morris Cooper S	10
DNF	A		59	Rolls Motors	(Australia) Trevor Meehan (Australia) Pat Holmes	Fiat 850	6
DSQ	D		1	Ford Motor Company of Australia	(Australia) Ian Geoghegan (Australia) Leo Geoghegan	Ford Cortina Mk.I GT500	130
DNS	A		46	Nissan Motor Distributors	(Australia) Spencer Martin (Australia) Bill Brown	Datsun Bluebird	
DNS	A		48	Nissan Motor Distributors	(Australia) Tony Simmons (Australia) Mike Champion	Datsun Bluebird	
DNS	A		51	Nissan Motor Distributors	(Australia) Bruce Demuth (Australia) Bill Orr	Datsun Bluebird	

== Statistics ==
- Fastest Lap – #29 Brian Foley – 3:13.7 (lap record)
- Average Speed – 110 km/h
- Race time of first car home – 7:16:45.1
