= Vauxhall Viva =

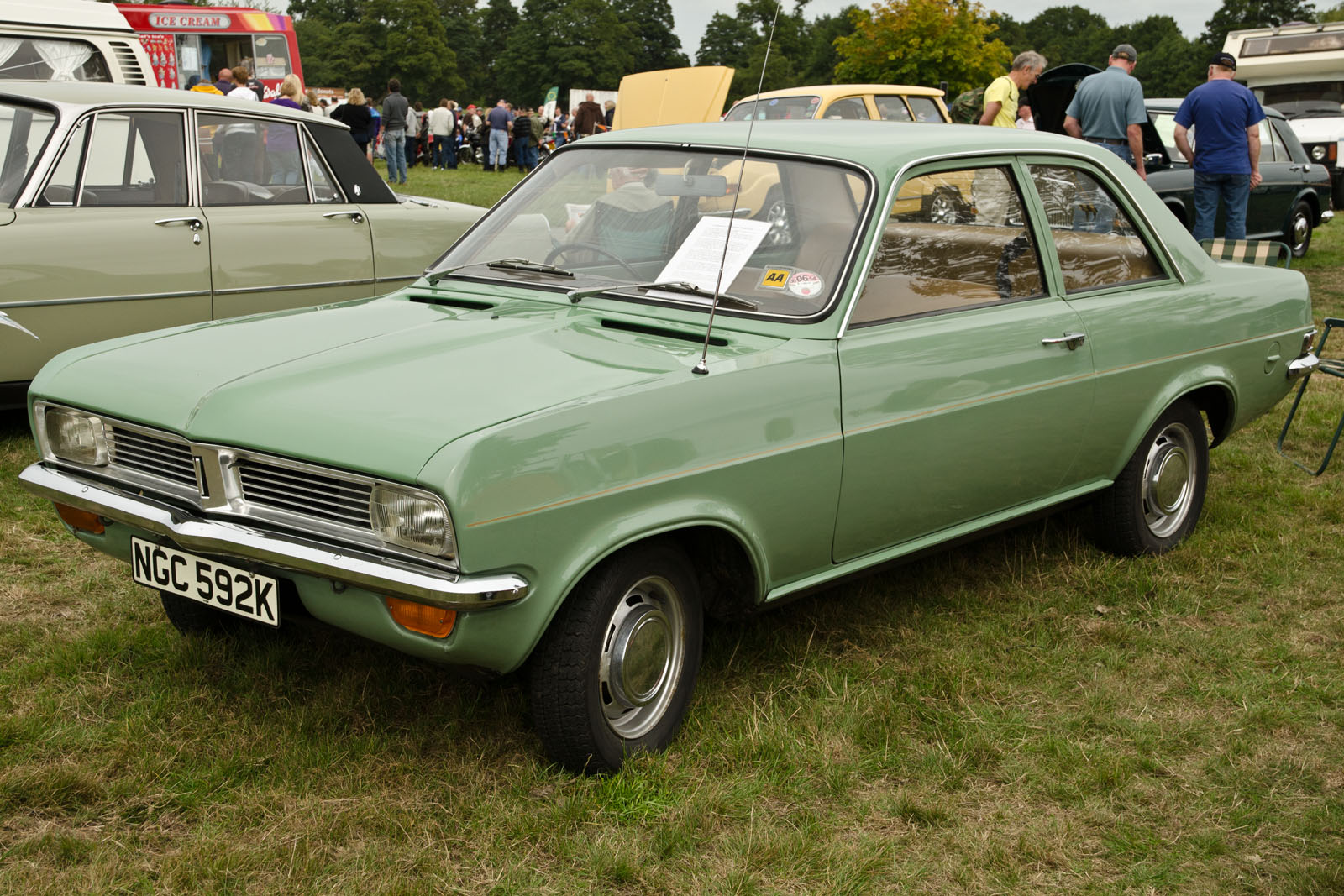
- Vauxhall Viva HC Series

Overview
- Manufacturer: Vauxhall
- Production: 1963–1979; 1,516,792 produced

Body and chassis
- Class: Small family car (C)

Chronology
- Successor: Vauxhall Astra; Vauxhall Chevette; Vauxhall Viva

The Vauxhall Viva is a small family car that was produced by Vauxhall in a succession of three versions between 1963 and 1979. These were designated the HA, HB and HC series.

The Viva was introduced a year after Vauxhall's fellow General Motors company Opel launched the Opel Kadett A. Both cars were a result of the same General Motors project sharing the same floorpan and engine construction. A major difference was the use of metric measurements for the Opel and Imperial units for the Vauxhall. The cars are visually similar, however few components are interchangeable. A van version was also produced, as the Bedford HA. In the UK the Viva's principal competitors at the time of its launch included the well-established Ford Anglia and Morris Minor.

The third generation HC series was the last solely Vauxhall designed passenger car when ceasing production in 1979. Although it was not the last Vauxhall designed vehicle to go out of production overall – that distinction belongs to the Bedford CF van. After the Viva range, General Motors Europe unified the Opel and Vauxhall brands around a single range of Opel-developed models.

Vauxhall revived the Viva nameplate from 2015 to 2019 on a rebadged variant of the fourth generation Opel Karl/Chevrolet Spark.

== HA Viva (1963–1966) ==
Vauxhall Viva HA
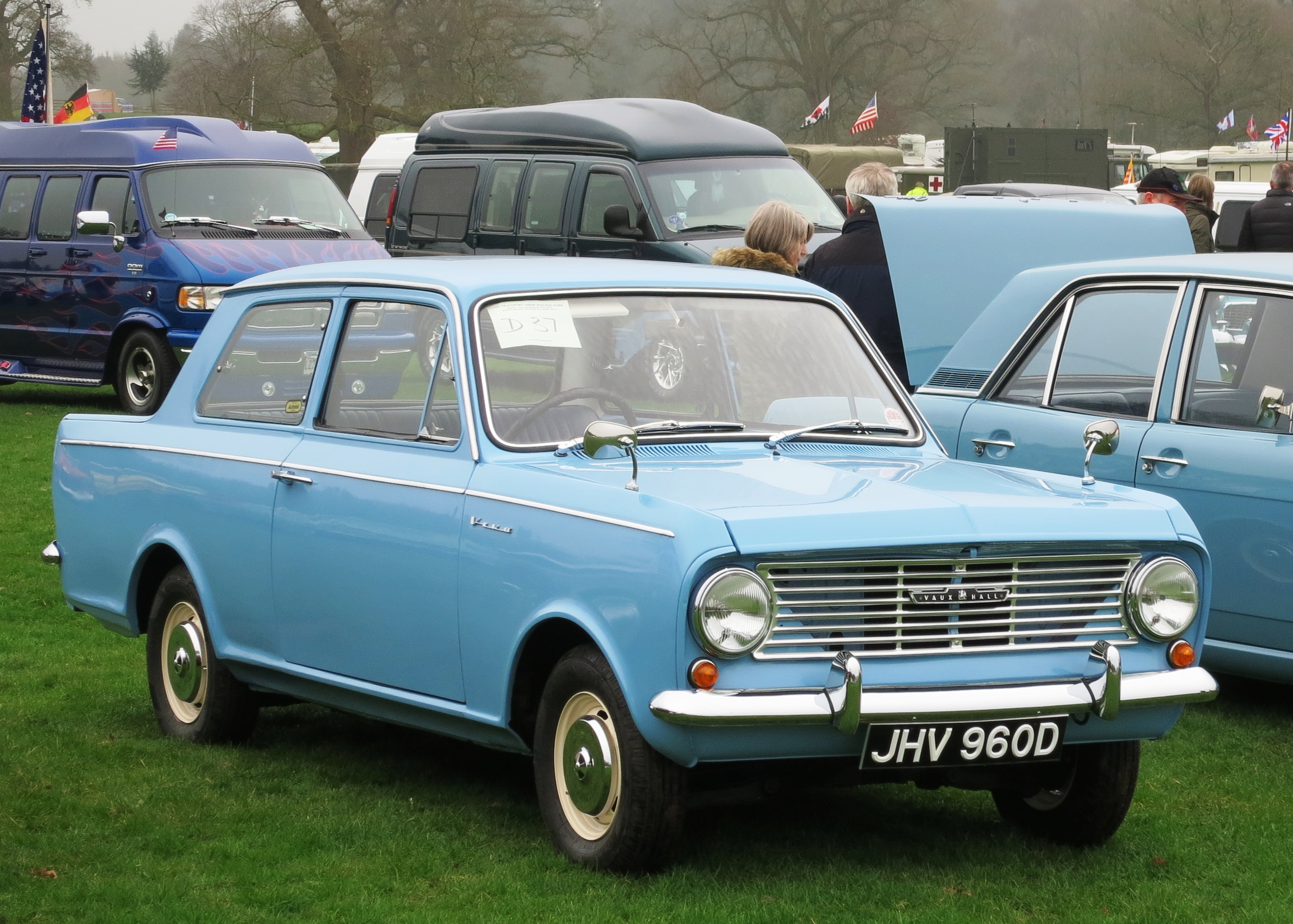
- Vauxhall Viva HA Series

Overview
- Also called: Vauxhall Epic (France, Algeria, Tunisia); Envoy Epic (Canada)
- Production: 1963–1966
- Assembly: United Kingdom; Australia; Azambuja, Portugal; Petone, New Zealand
- Designer: David Jones

Body and chassis
- Body style: 2-door saloon
- Related: Bedford HA; Bedford Beagle; Opel Kadett A

Powertrain
- Engine: 1,057 cc (64.5 cu in) ohv inline 4
- Transmission: 4-speed manual all-synchromesh

Dimensions
- Wheelbase: 91.5 in (2,324 mm)
- Length: 155 in (3,937 mm)
- Width: 59.5 in (1,511 mm)
- Height: 53.25 in (1,353 mm)
- Kerb weight: 1,564 lb (709 kg) (standard); 1,628 lb (738 kg) (90 SL)

Chronology
- Successor: HB Viva

The HA Viva, announced in September 1963, and replaced in September 1966, was Vauxhall's first serious step into the compact car market after World War II. It was also the first new small car produced by Vauxhall since 1936. The HA Viva was powered by a 1,057 cc (64.5 cu in), overhead valve, four cylinder, front-mounted engine driving the rear wheels. It was comparable in size and mechanical specifications with the new Opel Kadett released a year earlier in continental Europe, being a result of the same project — with the two cars sharing much of their inner structure and similar overall dimensions. The Viva and Kadett were sold alongside each other in many markets. The HA Viva was just an inch longer than the Ford Anglia which dated back to 1959. It was offered only as a two-door saloon, and competed with the Anglia as well as BMC's hugely successful and highly regarded new 1100 range.

The HA set new standards in its day for lightweight, easy to operate controls, a slick short gearchange, lightweight steering and clutch pedal, good all-round visibility and relatively nippy performance. It was one of the first cars to be actively marketed towards women, perhaps as a result of these perceived benefits for them.

The front crossmember (steering, suspension and engine mounting) assembly from the HA became a very popular item for DIY hot rod builders in the UK, due to its simple self-contained mechanics, similar to older designs such as those from the 1930s, and ability to accommodate much larger engines within its span. The assembly featured a double wishbone/vertical telescopic dampers suspension design in combination with a transverse leaf spring attached to the front crossmember at its centre position and the entire unit could be removed and adapted to another vehicle. (For similar reasons the Jaguar independent rear suspension assembly was often used at the rear of these custom cars). The Viva's rear suspension made do with conventional longitudinal semi-elliptic leaf springs and telescopic dampers. The progressive suspension including a very clever mounting design for the rear axle and the transverse leaf system of the front suspension led to a soft ride on small bumps but with very acceptable roll characteristics on corners along with its precise steering and small turning circle.

In Canada, the HA was sold as the Vauxhall Viva by Pontiac/Buick dealers and also as the Envoy Epic by Chevrolet/Oldsmobile dealers, and was second in sales to the Volkswagen Beetle amongst imported compact cars. In France (and Algeria and Tunisia), the car was marketed as the Vauxhall Epic.

The Viva was initially launched in Standard and Deluxe versions, identifiable by their simple horizontal slatted metal grilles. Minor changes in September 1964 included improved seats and more highly geared steering. A more luxurious SL (for Super Luxury) variant appeared in June 1965. The SL differed from the base models by a relatively elaborate grille and, normally, by a painted strip along the side of the car. Unlike the base model with its unique tail lamp design, the SL featured a horizontal row of three plain, round Lucas parts-bin lamps, not unlike the vertical arrangement employed on Singer Gazelle cars of that era. Engines were available in two states of tune: entry-level models came with a power output of 44 bhp (33 kW), while the Viva 90, introduced in October 1965, had a higher 9:1 compression ratio and produced 54 bhp (40 kW). The availability of two engines and three trim options enabled Vauxhall to offer six Viva variants in some markets. 90 models came with front disc brakes, while SLs featured contrasting bodyside flashes, a criss-cross chrome plated front grille, full wheel covers, three-element round tail lights and better interior trim.

During its first ten months, over 100,000 HA Vivas were made, and by 1966 the HA had chalked up over 306,000 sales, proving that Vauxhall had made a successful return to the small-car market, which they had abandoned following the Second World War. One measure of the success is the fact that a budget was made available to design the car's successor with a virtually clean sheet. The Viva HB inherited engines, but little else, from the HA. 309,538 Viva HAs were produced.

The HA, however, suffered severely from corrosion problems along with other Vauxhall models of the time and very few of this model remain – one of the main problem areas being the cappings along the top side edges of the luggage compartment badly corroding and allowing water to enter, consequently leading to severe structural corrosion in the luggage-compartment floor area. As with a lot of other British cars of that period, many Vivas failed to survive long term.

The HA Viva was assembled in Australia by Holden commencing in 1964, and in New Zealand by General Motors at Petone. New Zealand built only the Deluxe model and a few base versions for government fleet contracts.

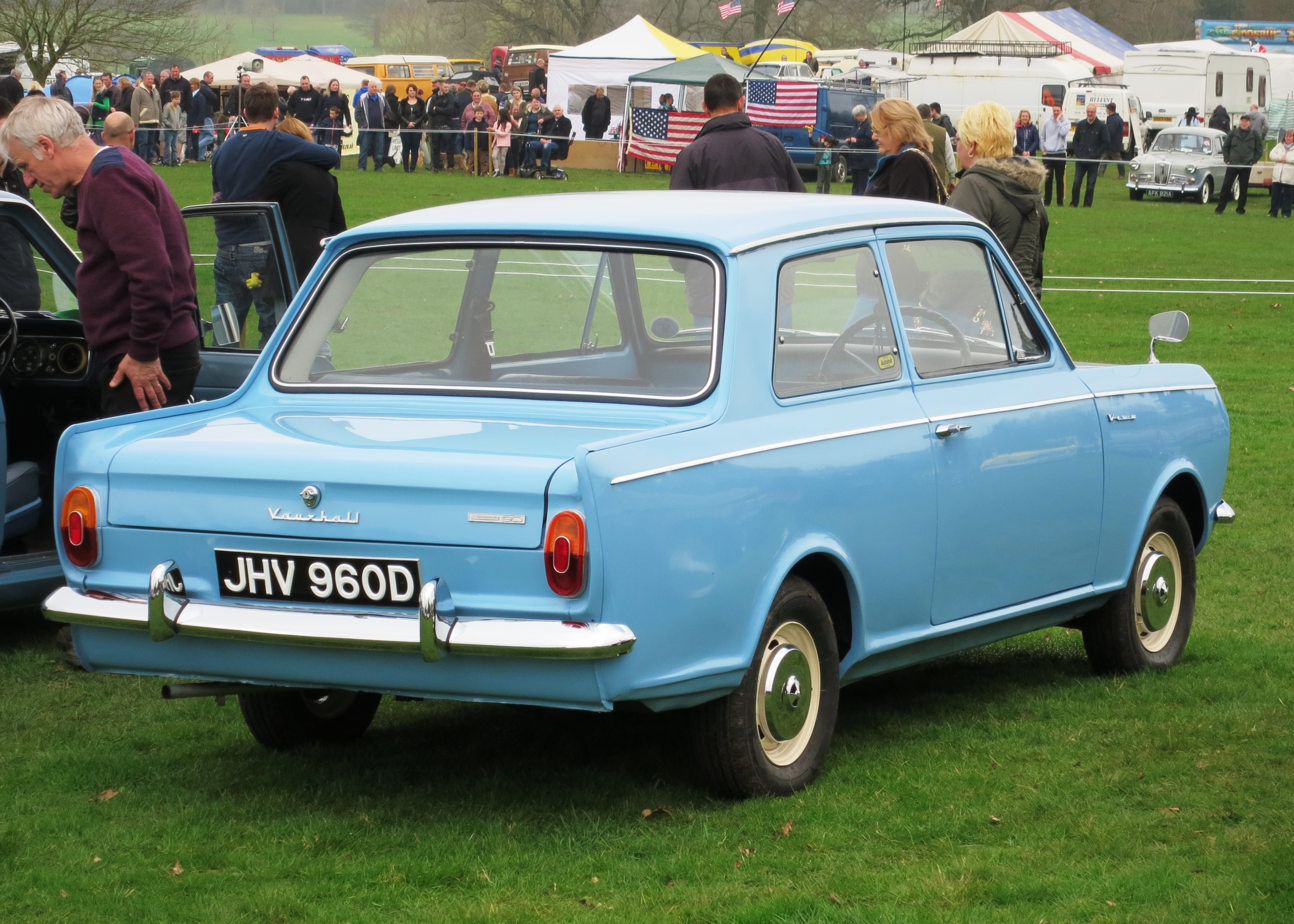
Viva HA de luxe from behind. The styling of the HA was acceptably modern though in most respects, compared to its replacement, it was a relatively plain design.

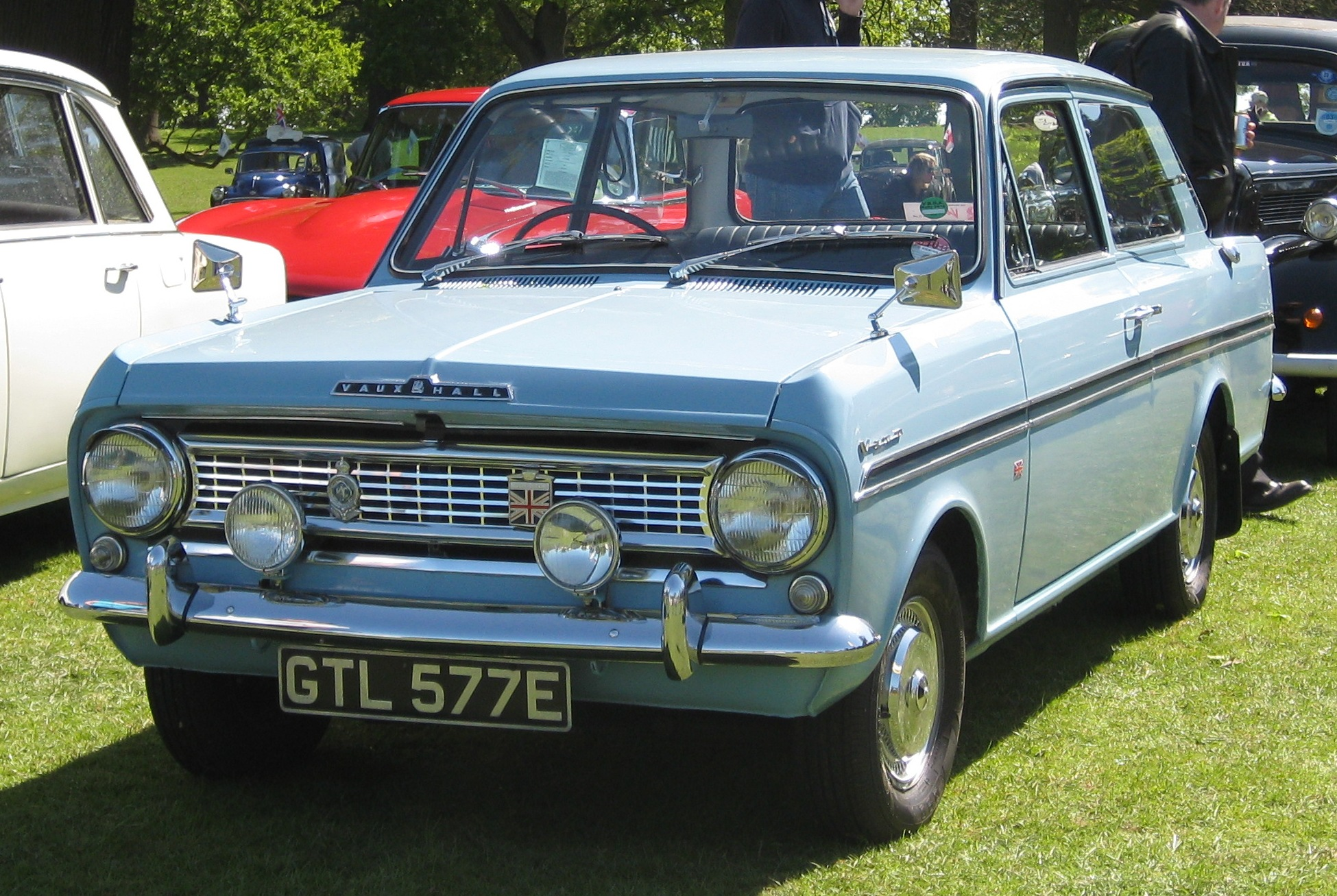
Viva HA SL: with the more elaborate grille and coloured strips along the sides of the car. This style of grille was also used on the Canadian-market Envoy Epic.

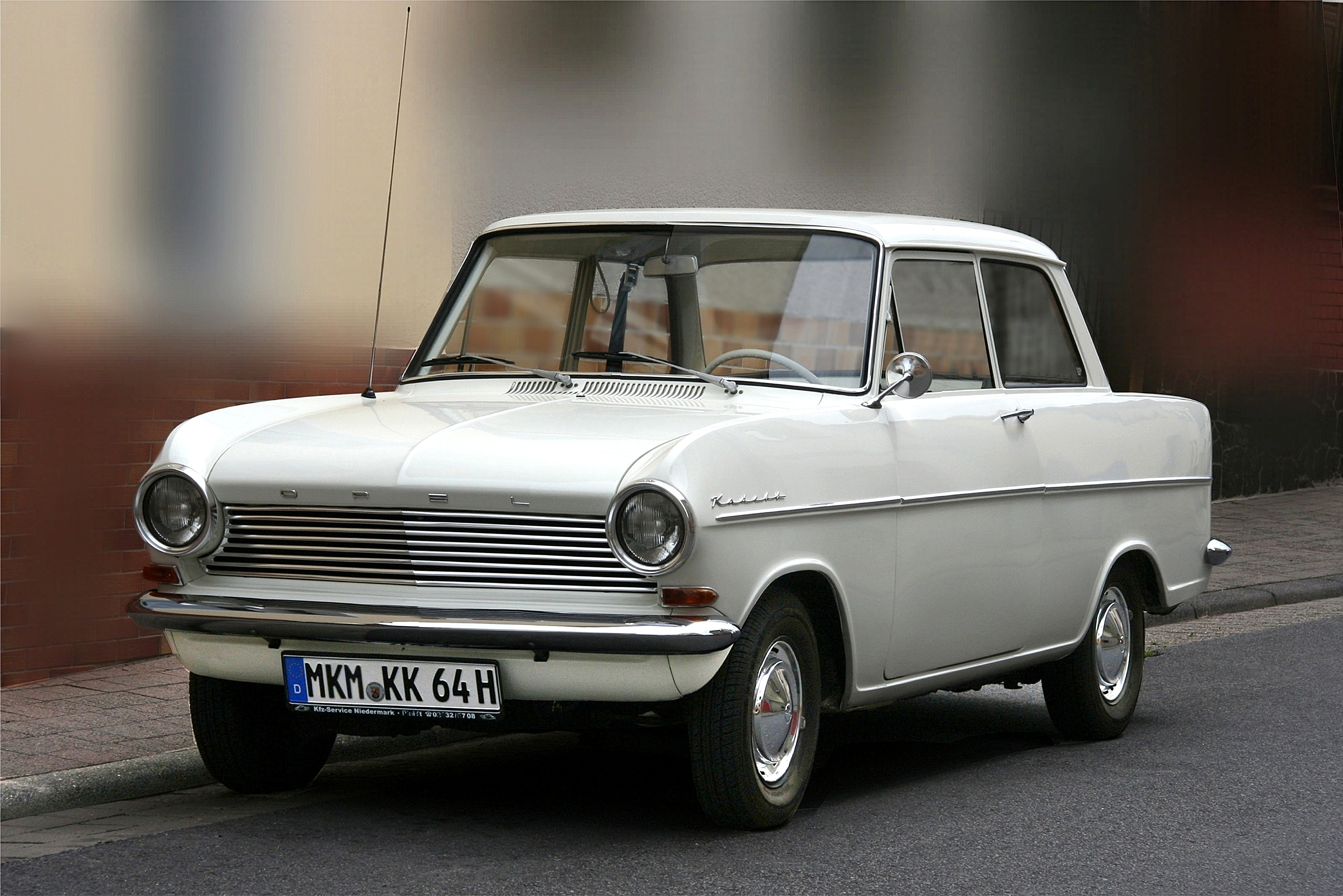
1964 Opel Kadett A: The Opel Kadett A and the 1964 Vauxhall Viva HA were both developed under conditions of some secrecy. The obvious similarity of the two models suggests closer links between the project development teams than was acknowledged at the time.

=== Bedford HA ===
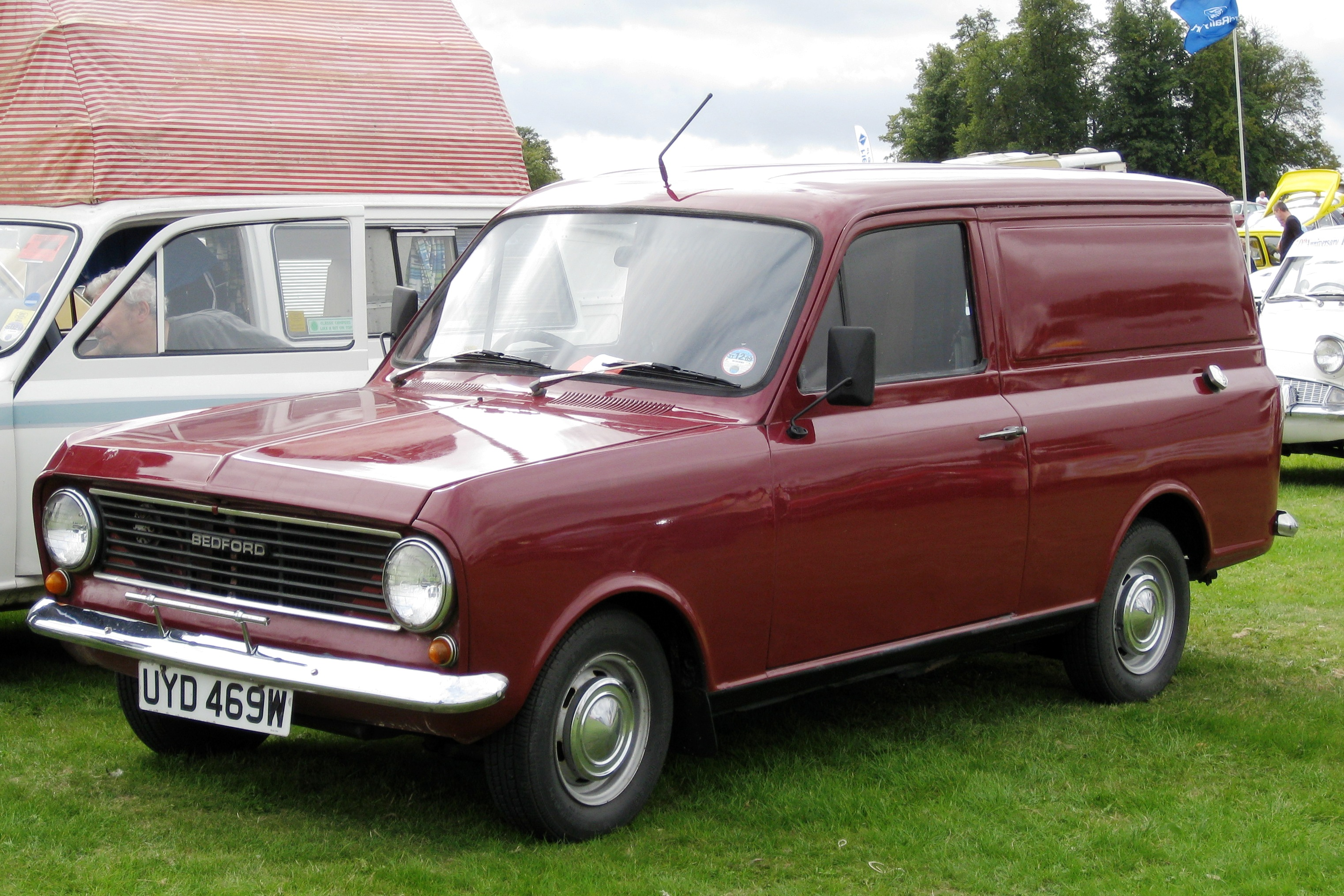
1981 Bedford HA van

A van version was marketed as the Bedford HA and was offered in 6 cwt, 8 cwt and, from 1972, 10 cwt variants. It differed from the saloon in being taller, and thousands were bought by the GPO (later British Telecom), their bright yellow HA vans becoming a common sight. The HA Van was eventually supplanted by the Chevanne, but because of fleet orders, particularly from British Telecom, British Rail and the Post Office, the HA van remained in production, ultimately using the later HC Viva's engine and gearbox, all the way through to 1983.

=== Bedford Beagle ===
Although no factory built estate versions of the HA Viva were offered, a limited-production estate conversion by Martin Walter Ltd. of Folkestone, based on the closely related Bedford HA van, was marketed as the Bedford Beagle.

== HB Viva (1966–1970) ==
Vauxhall Viva HB
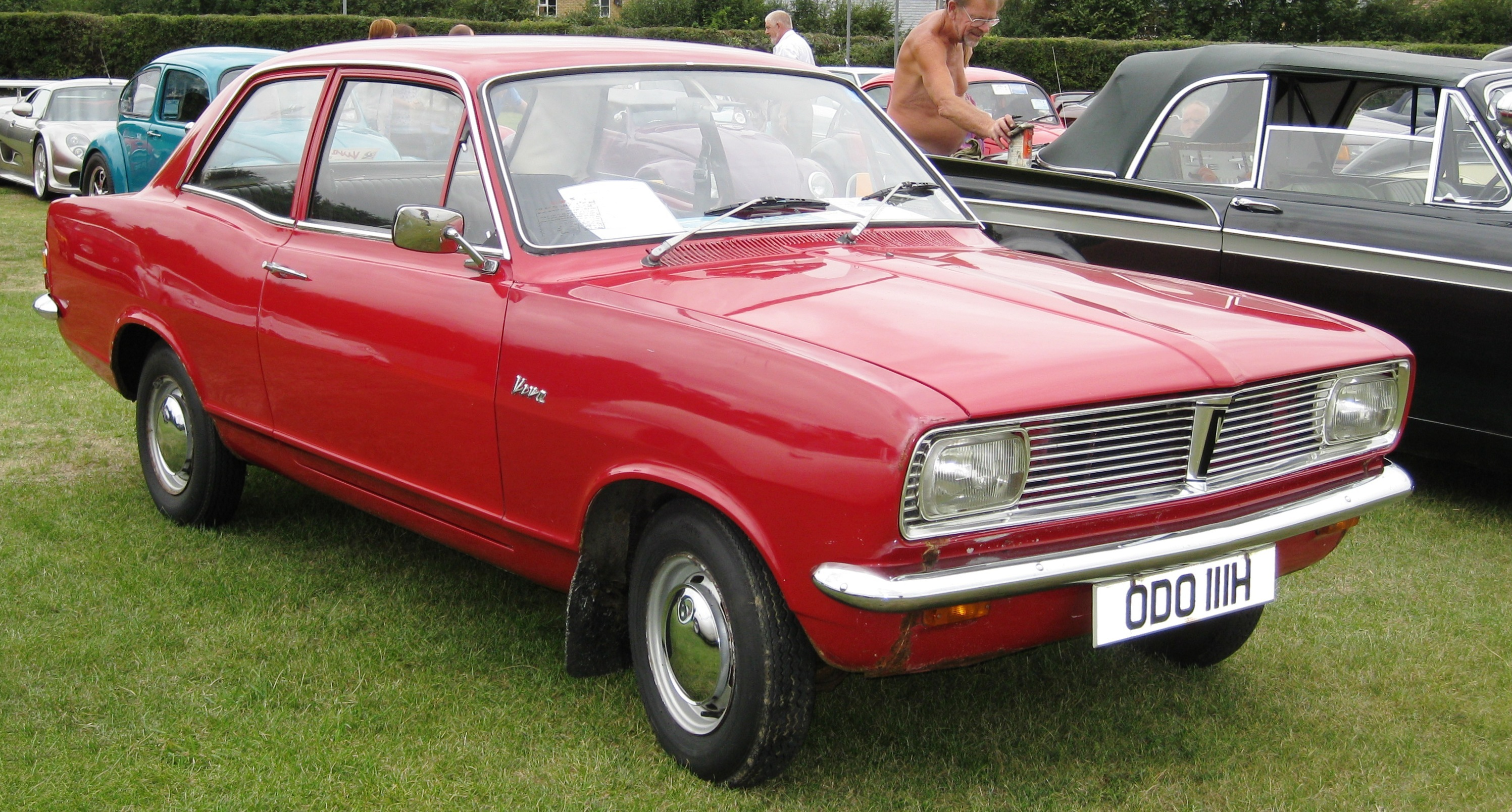
- Vauxhall Viva HB Series

Overview
- Also called: Envoy Epic (Canada)
- Production: September 1966 – July 1970
- Designer: David Jones

Body and chassis
- Body style: 2-door saloon; 4-door saloon; 3-door estate
- Related: Holden Torana

Powertrain
- Engine: 1159 cc ohv Straight-four engine; 1599 cc Slant-4 I4; 1975 cc Slant-4 I4 (GT)
- Transmission: 4-speed manual all-synchromesh; optional Borg Warner Type 35 automatic from February 1967

Dimensions
- Wheelbase: 95.75 in (2,432 mm)
- Length: 161.6 in (4,105 mm)
- Width: 63 in (1,600 mm)
- Height: 53.3 in (1,354 mm)
- Curb weight: 1,698 lb (770 kg) (standard); 2,070 lb (939 kg) (GT)

Chronology
- Predecessor: HA Viva
- Successor: HC Viva

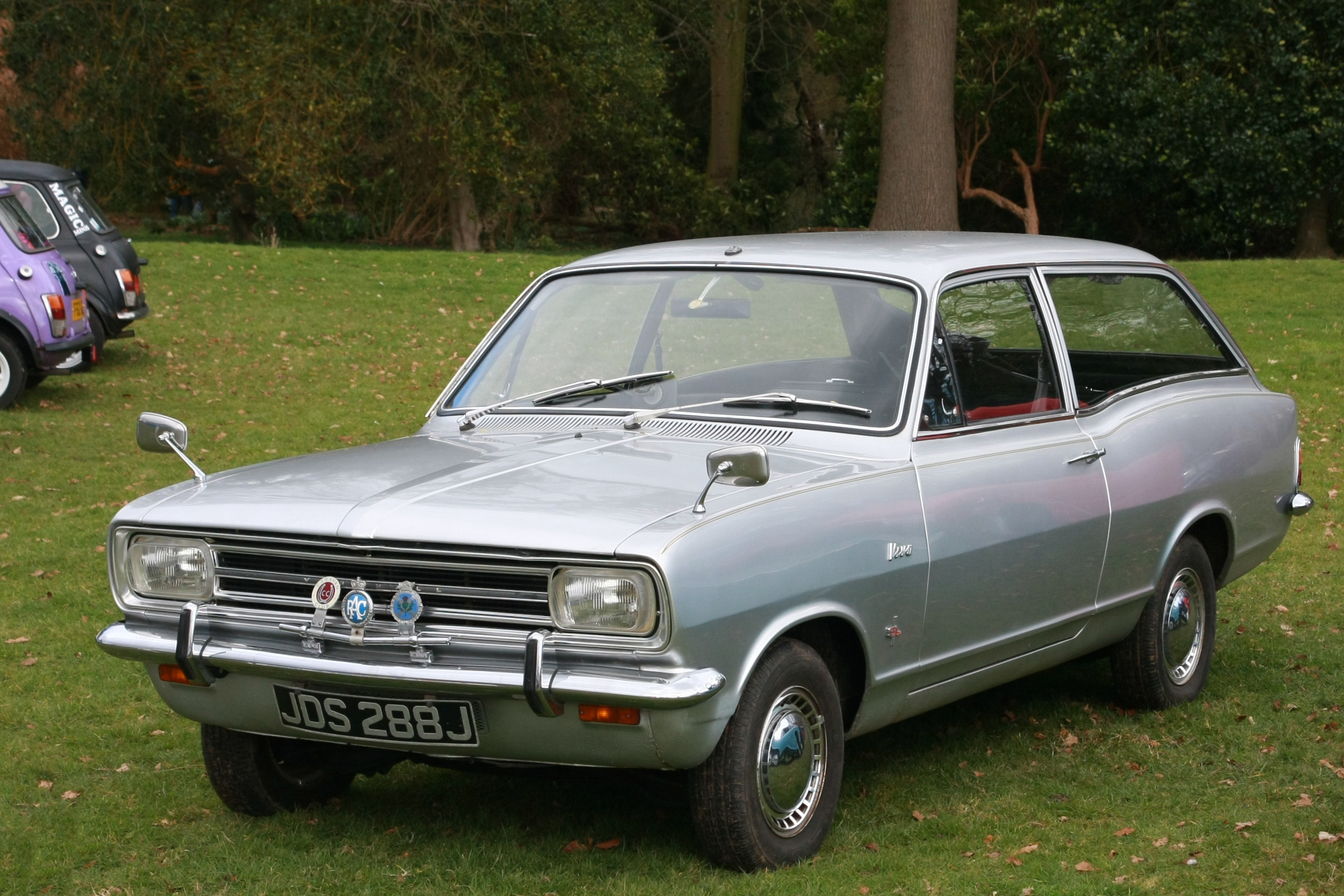
Viva HB Estate

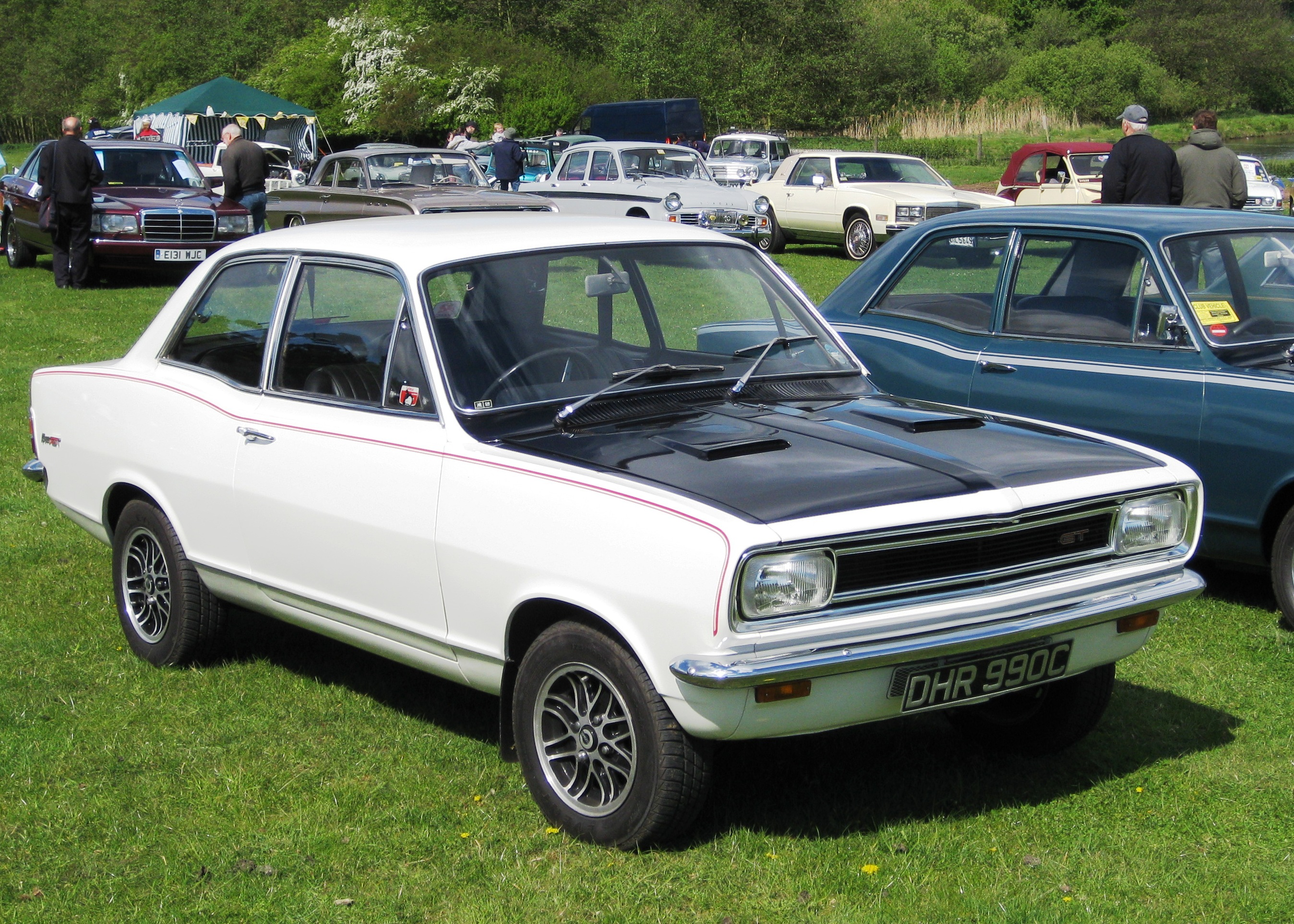
The black bonnet / hood was a distinguishing feature of the HB Viva GT

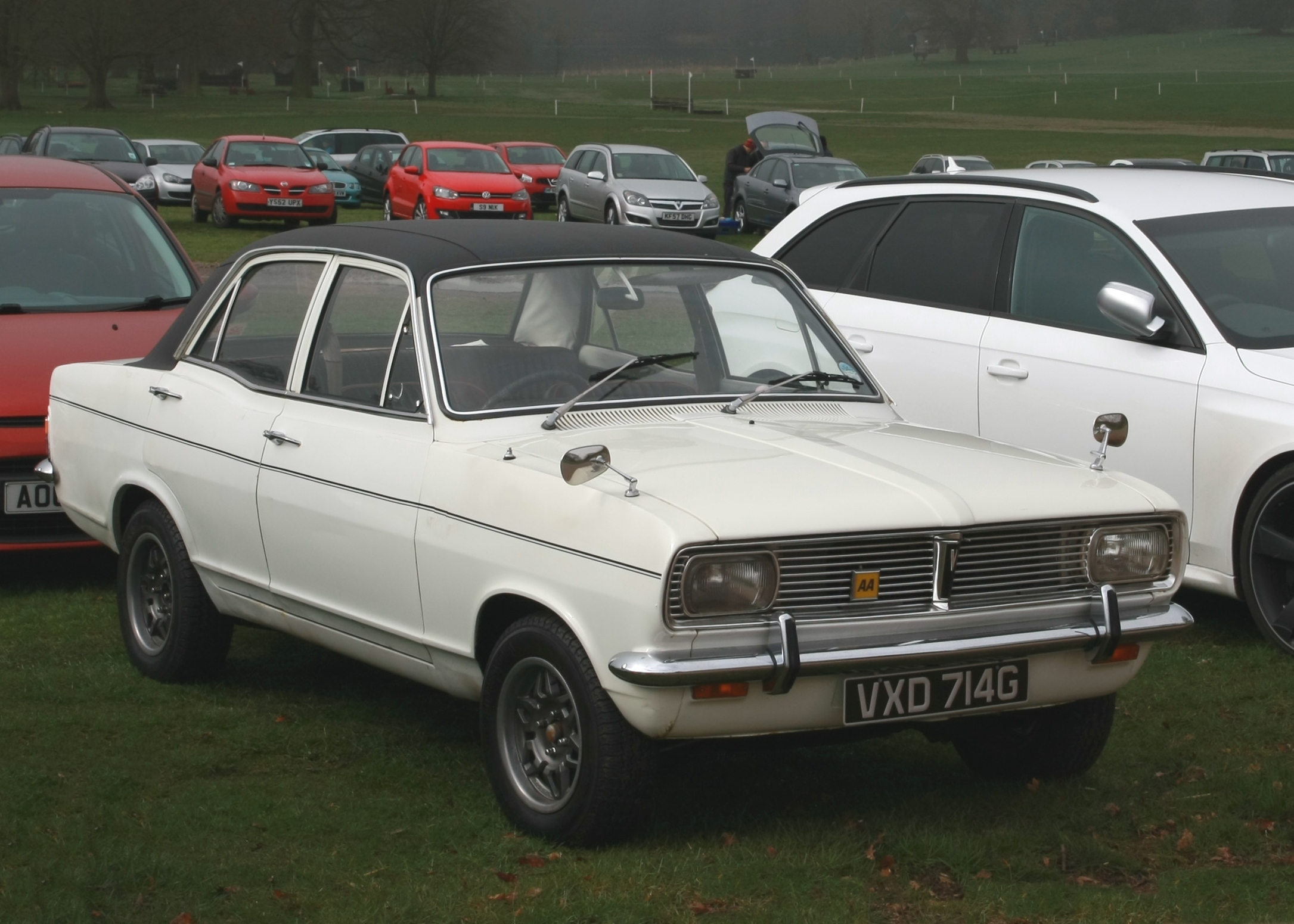
The HB was the first Viva to be offered with four doors

The HB Viva, announced in September 1966 and sold by Vauxhall until 1970, was a larger car than the HA, featuring coke bottle styling, and was modelled after American General Motors (GM) models such as the Chevrolet Impala/Caprice of the period, and was a solely Vauxhall design — likewise Opel had also developed the equivalent Opel Kadett B with no platform sharing, unlike the previous generation. It featured the same basic engine as the HA, but enlarged to 1,159 cc, but with the added weight of the larger body the final drive gearing was reduced from 3.9 to 1 to 4.1 to keep the nippy performance (except the SL90 which retained the 3.9 diff having the power to cope with the higher ratio).

The automatic Viva HB was offered from February 1967, and fitted with the ubiquitous Borg Warner Type 35 system. Cars of this size featuring automatic transmission were still unusual owing to the amount of power the transmission systems absorbed: a major British motoring journal later described Viva HBs with automatic transmission as "among the slowest cars on the road".

The HB used a completely different suspension design from the HA, having double-wishbone and coil springs with integrated telescopic dampers at the front, and trailing arms and coil springs at the rear. Lateral location and anti-squat of the rear axle was achieved using upper trailing arms mounted at approximately 45° fixed to lugs at the top of the differential. Both front and rear could also be fitted with optional anti-roll bars. The HB set new standards for handling in its class as a result of the adoption of this suspension design, where many of its contemporaries stuck with leaf springs and MacPherson struts.

This time, apart from the standard and 90 stages of tune, there was also, for a brief time, a Brabham SL/90 HB that was purported to have been developed with the aid of world racing champion Jack Brabham. Brabham models were marked out externally by distinctive lateral black stripes at the front of the bonnet that curved down the wings and then headed back to end in a taper at the front doors. This model is almost impossible to find today. This model and the Viva GT are the two most sought after models made. The Brabham model differed from the standard Viva SL/90 in having a different cam-shaft, uprated suspension with anti-roll bars, different exhaust manifolds, and a unique twin-carb manifold, as well as differing interior trim. The Viva GT had substantially different engine and running gear and interior from the standard Viva HB models. It was distinguished by having a black bonnet with twin louvres and being all-over white. Later GTs came in different colours.

Two larger overhead camshaft engines from the larger Vauxhall Victor were also offered – a twin carb 1975 cc in the Viva GT from Feb 1968 and a 1599 cc making up the Viva 1600 from May 1968.

With the expanded engine programme, the HB saw numerous permutations of model offerings, with base, deluxe and SL trims offered with a choice of standard 1.2, tuned 90 1.2, Brabham 90 1.2 and the aforementioned overhead cam units offered during its run. The Brabham was effectively replaced by the 1600, although many complained of high fuel consumption with this engine. Front disc brakes came with the 90 and overhead cam engine models, while a larger 12 gallon fuel tank was also part of the 1600 and GT package.

The brakes were problematic: a 1971 survey of passenger cars registered in Sweden during 1967 place the HB Viva at the top of a list of cars identified as having faulty brakes as part of an annual testing procedure. Problems were concentrated on uneven braking and dragging brakes, generally at the rear, and affected 26% of the cars tested. Second on the list, with 24% of cars triggering brake fault reports, was the similarly configured Opel Kadett estate. Although it avoided the bottom spot in other individual categories, the poor score achieved by the brakes left the Viva with the highest overall rate of failure of the 34 passenger cars included in sufficient numbers to feature in the reports of the Swedish test results.

Originally offered as just a two-door saloon, a three-door estate joined the HB range in June 1967, but the advent of the four-door in October 1968 saw the HB breaking sales records worldwide. The introduction of the four-door option coincided with various minor improvements to the interior trim, while 'auxiliary' switches were relocated from a remote panel to positions nearer to the steering wheel. The GM "energy absorbing" steering column was now fitted to all models and the fuel tank capacity was increased from 8 to 12 British gallons (36 to 55 litres). The 4-door saloon was designed and engineered by Holden in Australia who exported it as a kit of parts back to Vauxhall in England.

In the later 1960s and early 1970s, Britain's Motor magazine polled readers about their cars: they included a poll of HB Viva 1600 owners. The answers given greatest prominence were to the final question which asked whether or not respondents would buy another car of the same model: just 21% of Viva 1600 owning respondents answered "yes", which was the lowest score for this question achieved by any of the first seventeen models for which surveys were conducted. By the time of the readership poll, the HB Viva was within a year of being replaced even though the 1600 version itself had only been offered since 1968, so the sample will have been relatively small: it appears that the low satisfaction rate may have reflected not so much the car's design but rather a lack of effective quality control in the manufacturing processes.

A van version of the Viva HB was developed, but it never got beyond the prototype/mock-up stage. However, General Motors New Zealand did sell versions of the three-door estate with no rear seat as 'van' models and continued this with the later HC version.

Aftermarket conversion specialists, Crayford, also ran off some convertibles based on the 2-door Viva. Very few of these conversions exist still, only two GT model HBs were converted, but both are known to survive, and will likely be on the show scene in the coming years.

=== Other markets ===
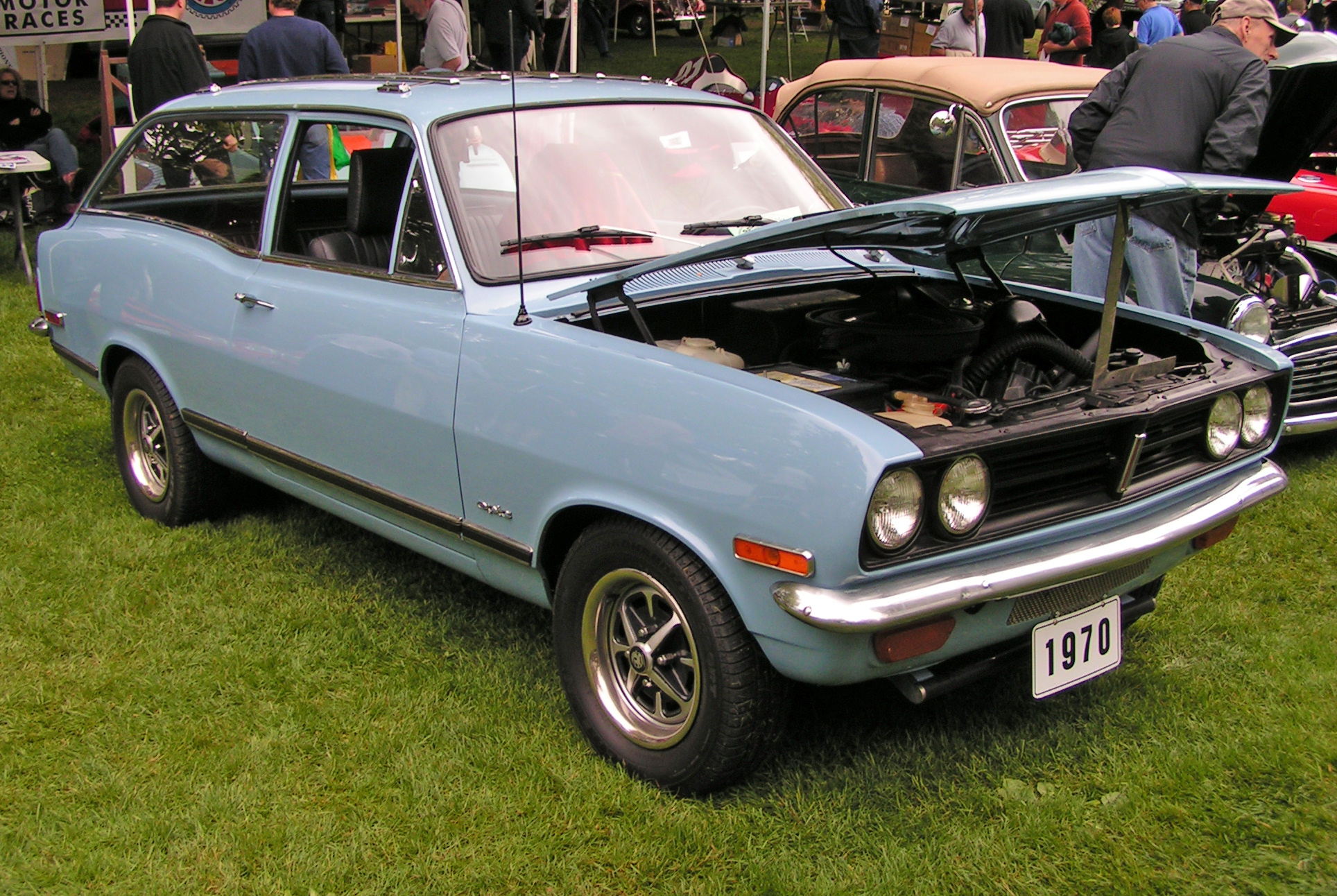
1970 Envoy Epic 1600 Deluxe estate (Canada)

A variant of the HB Viva was also built in Australia, by Holden, from 1967 to 1969 and marketed there as the Holden HB Torana. Oddly enough despite being closer in physical location to Australia, all HB Vivas sold in New Zealand were produced from CKD kits imported from the UK and sold as Vauxhalls. The New Zealand Vivas were two- and four-door Deluxe saloons, the latter with the '90' engine. Automatic was not offered, nor was the SL trim. Some Deluxe Estates were also assembled locally along with a 'van' version minus the estate's rear seat.

The HB Viva entered the Canadian market for the 1967 model year, in standard, Deluxe, or SL models. Canadian Chevrolet/Oldsmobile dealers also continued to sell a rebadged HB as the Envoy Epic through 1970 while Pontiac/Buick dealers kept selling the car under its original name.

In South Africa, it was assembled locally. The GT model arrived there in mid-1969 and was available in a range of colours, unlike their British counterparts. The GT could be told by slim black stripes down the sides and a strip across the bonnet, as well as four exhaust tip and black paint in the area between the taillights. Power claimed was 112 hp (84 kW) SAE.

566,391 Viva HBs were produced. Body design had improved after Vauxhall's poor reputation with corrosion on previous models. The HB had better underbody protection, but UK cars were still prone to rusting through the front wings in the area behind the headlights where water, mud and salt could accumulate. This ongoing problem with salt on UK roads affected many makes and models, not just the Viva, but Vauxhall's ongoing poor reputation for corrosion undoubtedly contributed to the development of bolt-on wings and wheel-arch liners in subsequent generations of family passenger car.

== HC Viva (1970–1979) ==
Vauxhall Viva HC
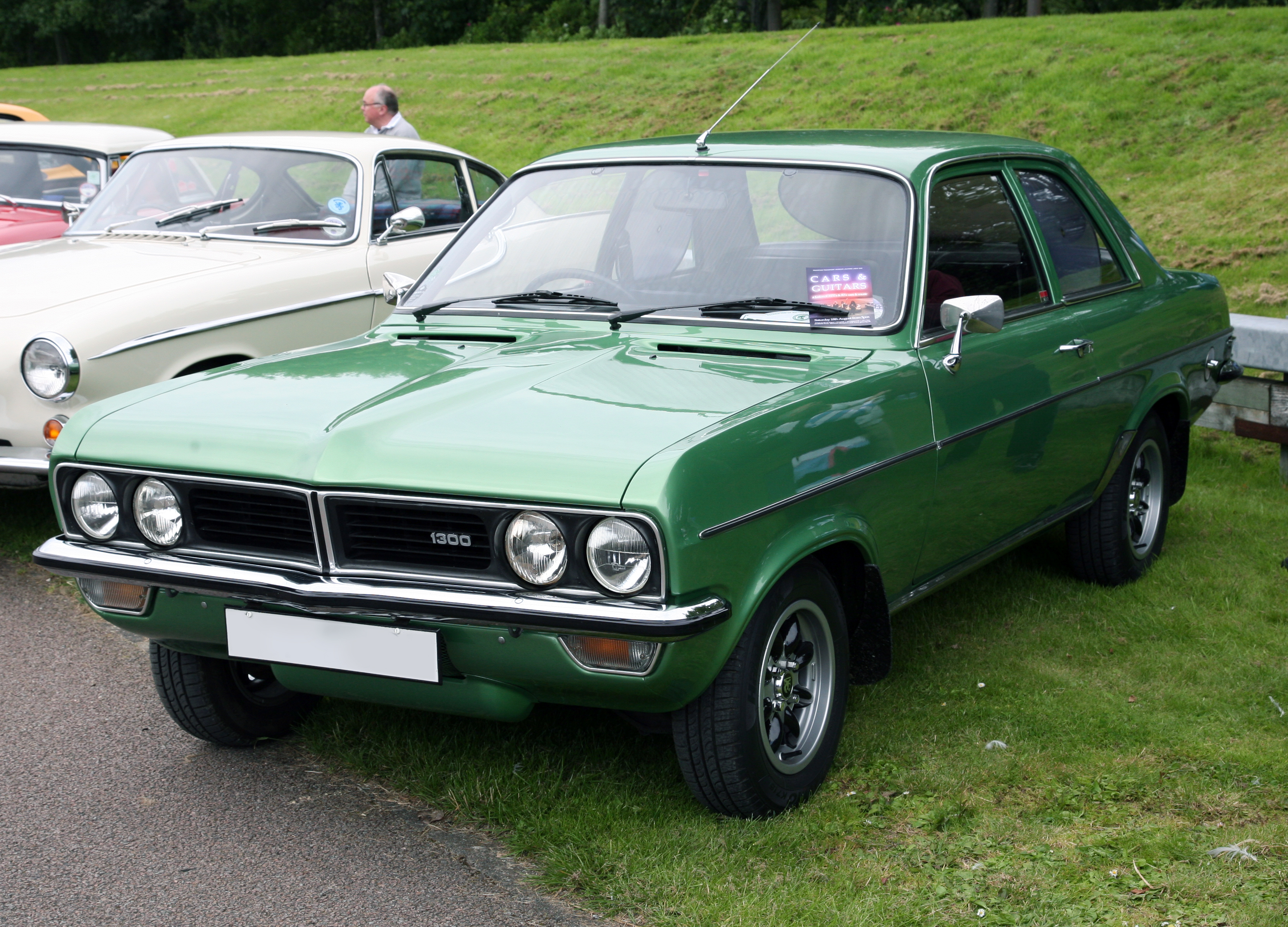
- Vauxhall Viva HC Series

Overview
- Also called: Firenza (Canada)
- Production: 1970–1979

Body and chassis
- Body style: 2-door saloon; 4-door saloon; 3-door estate
- Related: Vauxhall Magnum; Vauxhall Firenza; Chevrolet Firenza

Powertrain
- Engine: 1159 cc OHV I4; 1256 cc OHV I4; 1759 cc Slant-4 I4; 2279 cc Slant-4 I4
- Transmission: 4-speed manual; GM-Automatic (with 1,759 & 2,279 cc engines: Viva SL only)

Dimensions
- Wheelbase: 97 in (2,464 mm)
- Length: 162.875 in (4,137 mm)
- Width: 64.75 in (1,645 mm)
- Height: 53 in (1,346 mm)
- Curb weight: 1,837–2,237 lb (833–1,015 kg)

Chronology
- Predecessor: HB Viva
- Successor: Vauxhall Chevette; Vauxhall Astra

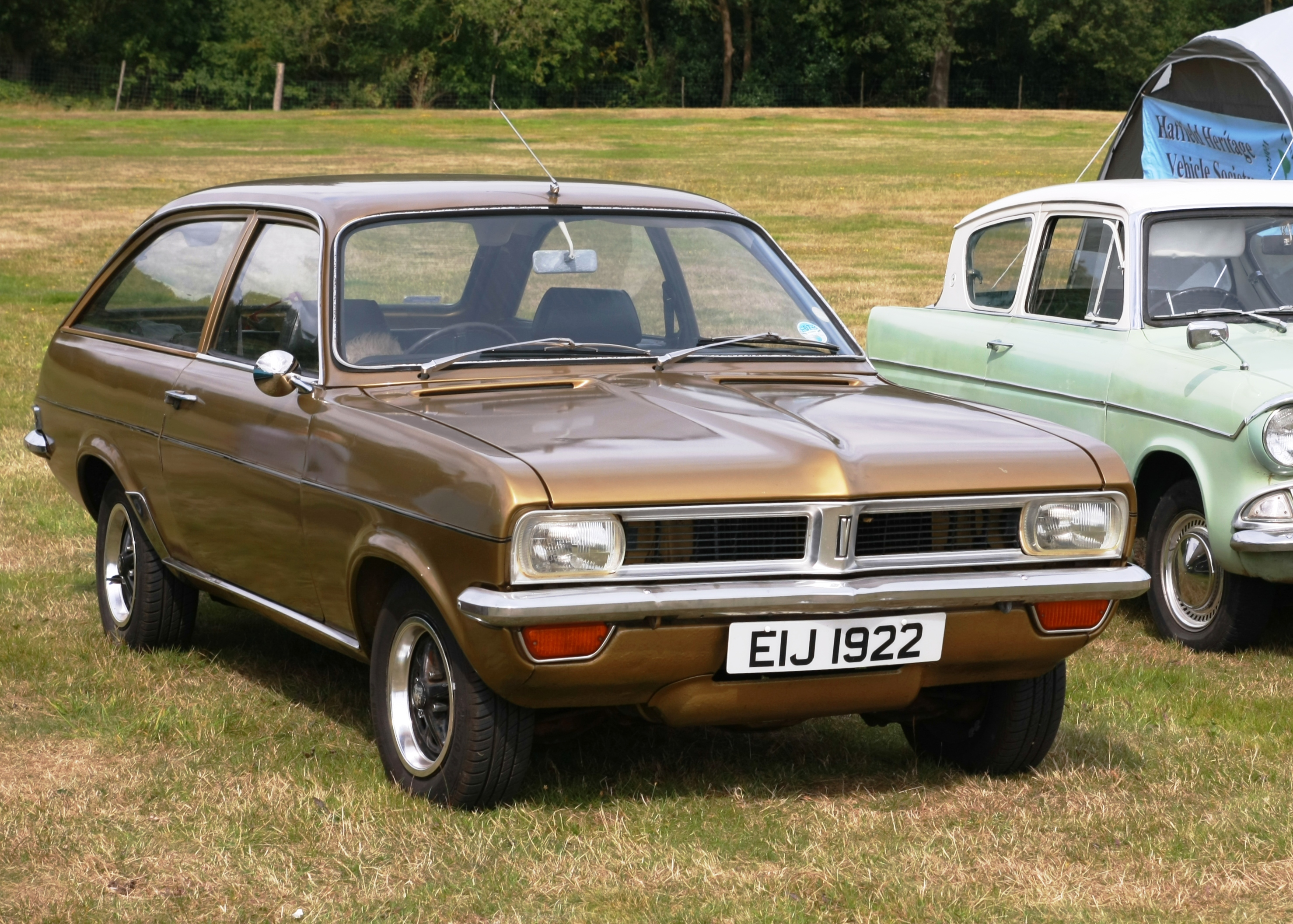
Viva HC Estate

The HC Viva (1970–79) was mechanically the same as the HB but had more modern styling and greater interior space due to redesigned seating and positioning of bulkheads. It offered two- and four-door saloons and a fastback estate with the choice of either standard 1159 cc, 90 tuned 1159 cc or 1600 cc overhead cam power. No 2.0 GT version was offered with the new range, although the 2.0 became the sole engine offering for Canada, where the HC became the Firenza, marketed by Pontiac/Buick dealers without the Vauxhall name. The cloned Envoy Epic was dropped as Chevrolet dealers now carried the domestic Chevrolet Vega. The HC was pulled from the Canadian market after two model years amidst consumer anger over corrosion and reliability issues.

The American influence was still obvious on the design, with narrow horizontal rear lamp clusters, flat dashboard with a "letterbox" style speedometer, and a pronounced mid bonnet hump that was echoed in the front bumper.

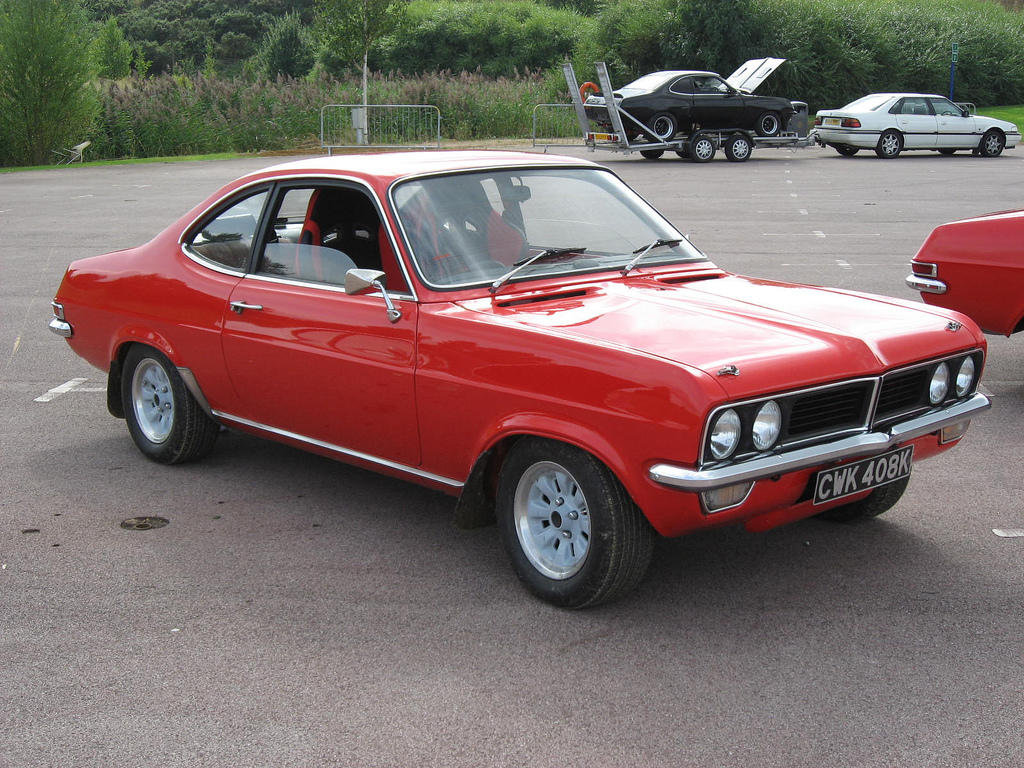
Firenza Coupé

A coupé version called the Firenza was introduced in early 1971 to compete with the Ford Capri and forthcoming Morris Marina Coupé. It was available in deluxe and SL forms, with the latter sporting four headlights and finally resurrecting the missing 2.0 twin-carburettor engine from the HB Viva GT.

The basic 1159 cc engine was enlarged to 1256 cc in late 1971 and with this the 90 version was removed from the line-up.

The overhead cam engines were upgraded in early 1972, the 1.6 becoming a 1.8 (1759 cc) and the 2.0 (1975 cc) twin carburettor became a 2.3 (2279 cc). At this time, the Viva 2300 SL and Firenza Sport SL did away with the letter-box speedometer and substituted a seven-dial instrument pack. Firenza SLs had a two round-dial pack, though all other Vivas and Firenzas stuck with the original presentation.

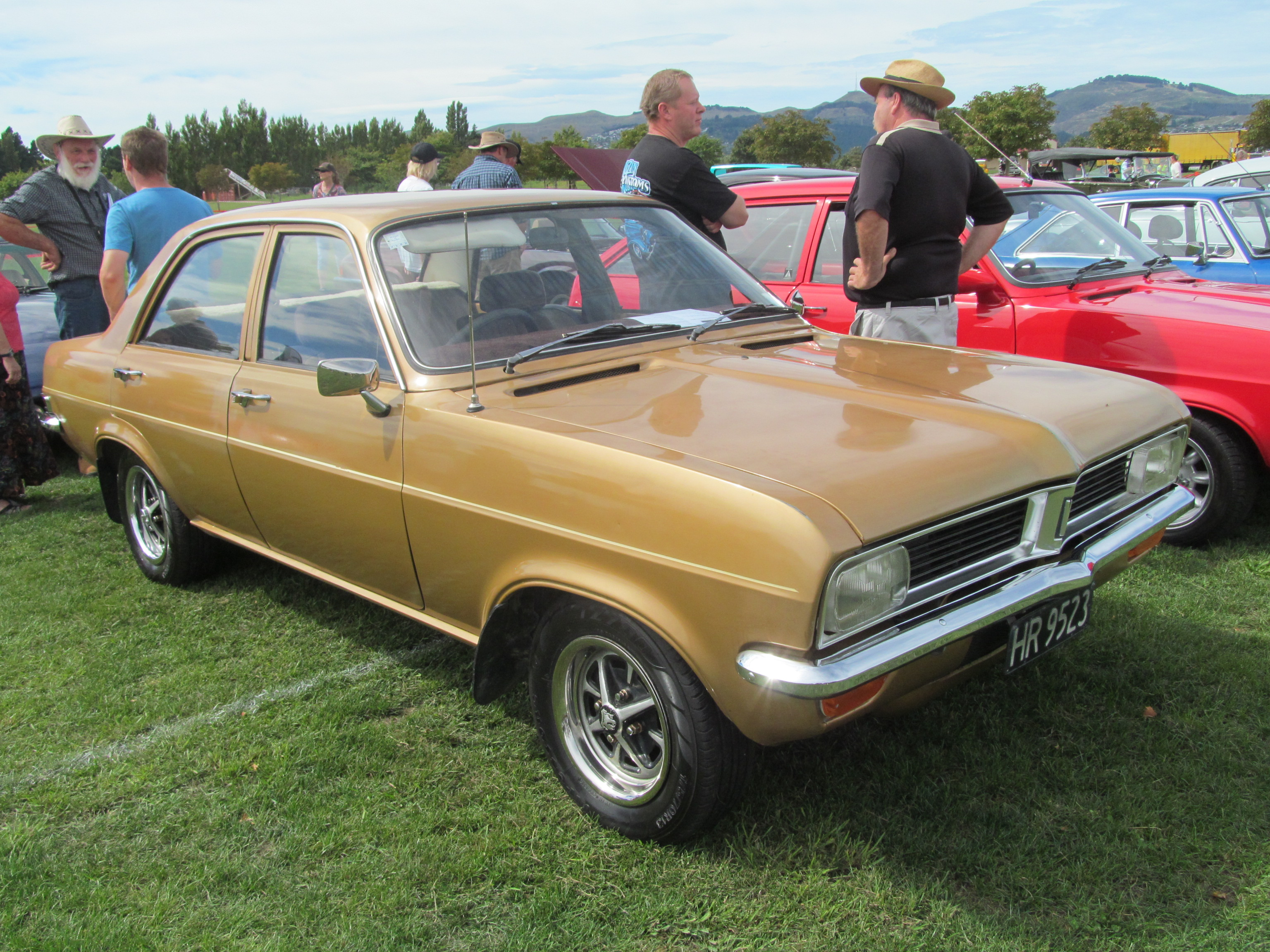
1975 Viva 1800 Saloon

In September 1973, the Viva range was divided, the entry 1256 cc models staying as Vivas, with the 1.8-litre engine an option on the Viva SL with an automatic transmission. The 1.8- and 2.3-litre models took on more luxurious trim and were rebadged as the Magnum. The whole range of Viva-based cars received safety equipment upgrades at the same time, with power-assisted dual-circuit brakes (with discs in front) being made standard. Safety belts, reclining front seats, two-speed windscreen wipers, and undercoating were also made standard across the board. Additionally, the Firenza coupé was given a radical makeover with an aerodynamic nose and beefed up 2.3-litre twin carb engine mated to a ZF five-speed gearbox, turning it into the HP (High Performance) Firenza.

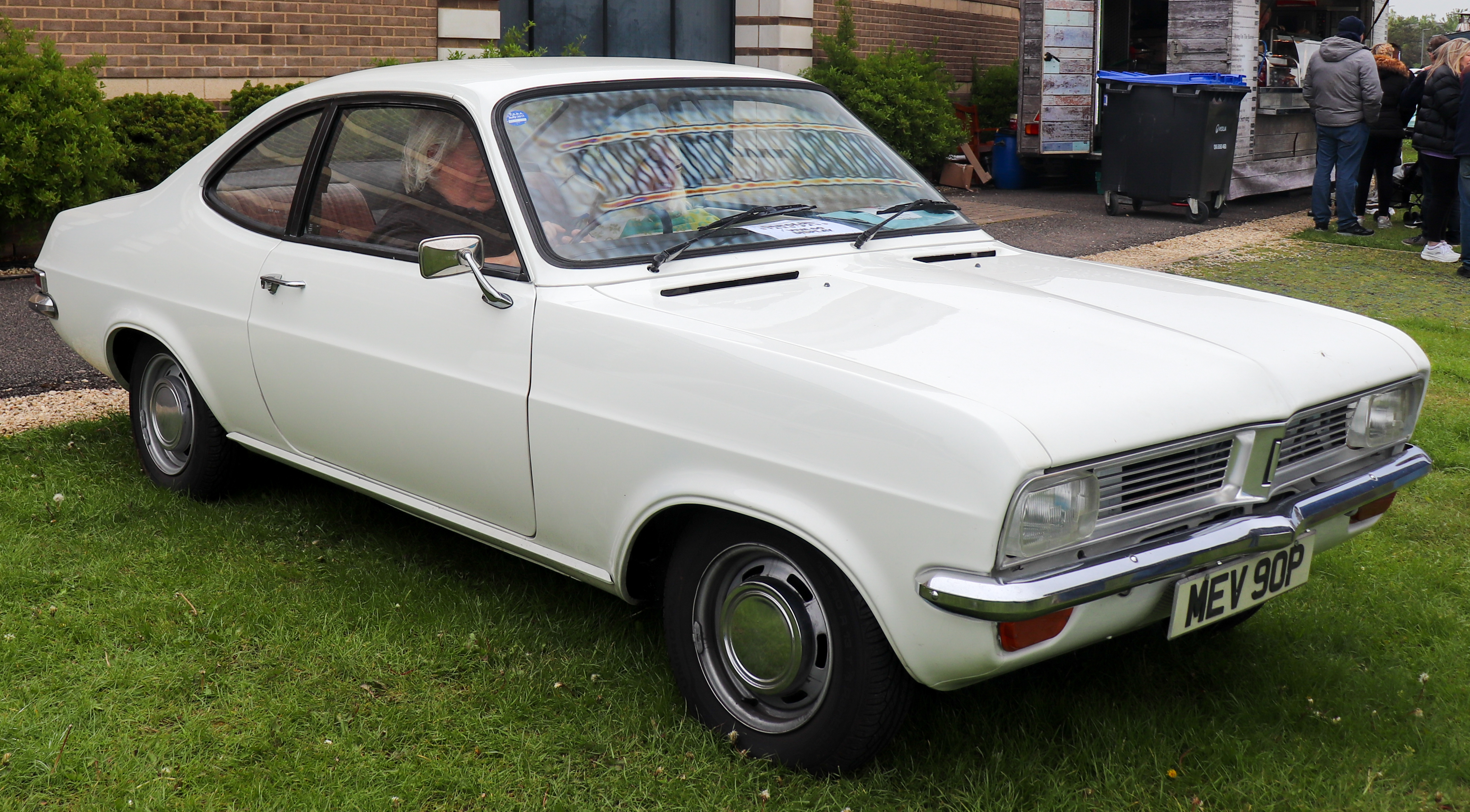

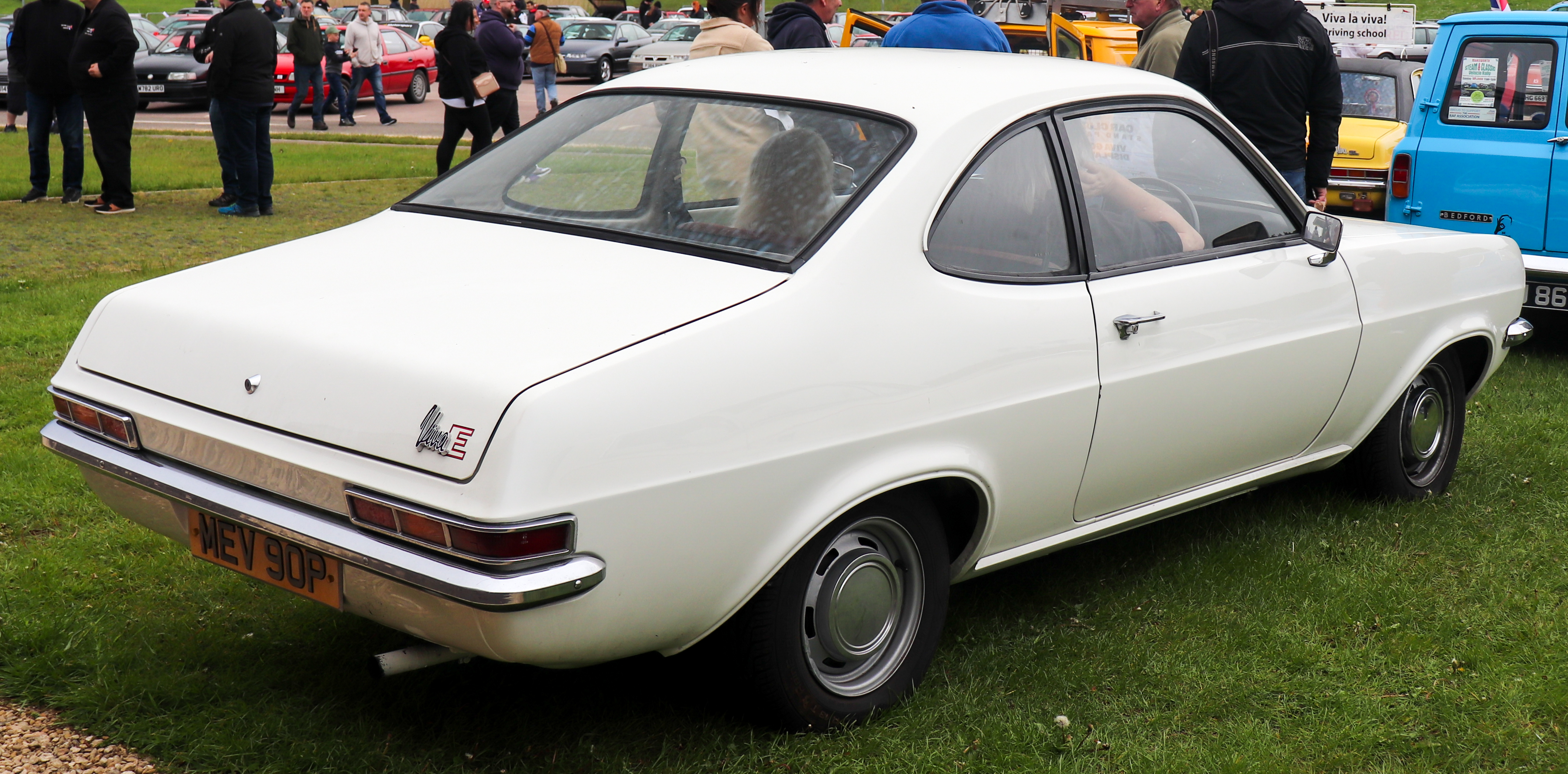
1975 1256 cc Viva E Coupé

The Viva was again revised in 1975, with trim levels becoming the E (for Economy), L and SL. The E was Vauxhall's answer to the Ford Popular and was first offered as a promotional edition two-door coupe using surplus Firenza body shells, before becoming a permanent Viva model in two-door saloon form. It was the only Viva to still have the strip speedometer after this as the L and SL adopted the Firenza SL's two round dial set up. As of the autumn of 1975 the 1800 engine was also upgraded, increasing power from 77 to 88 hp (57 to 66 kW). In 1977–78, there was also a limited-edition ES model with a slightly improved specification over the E model.

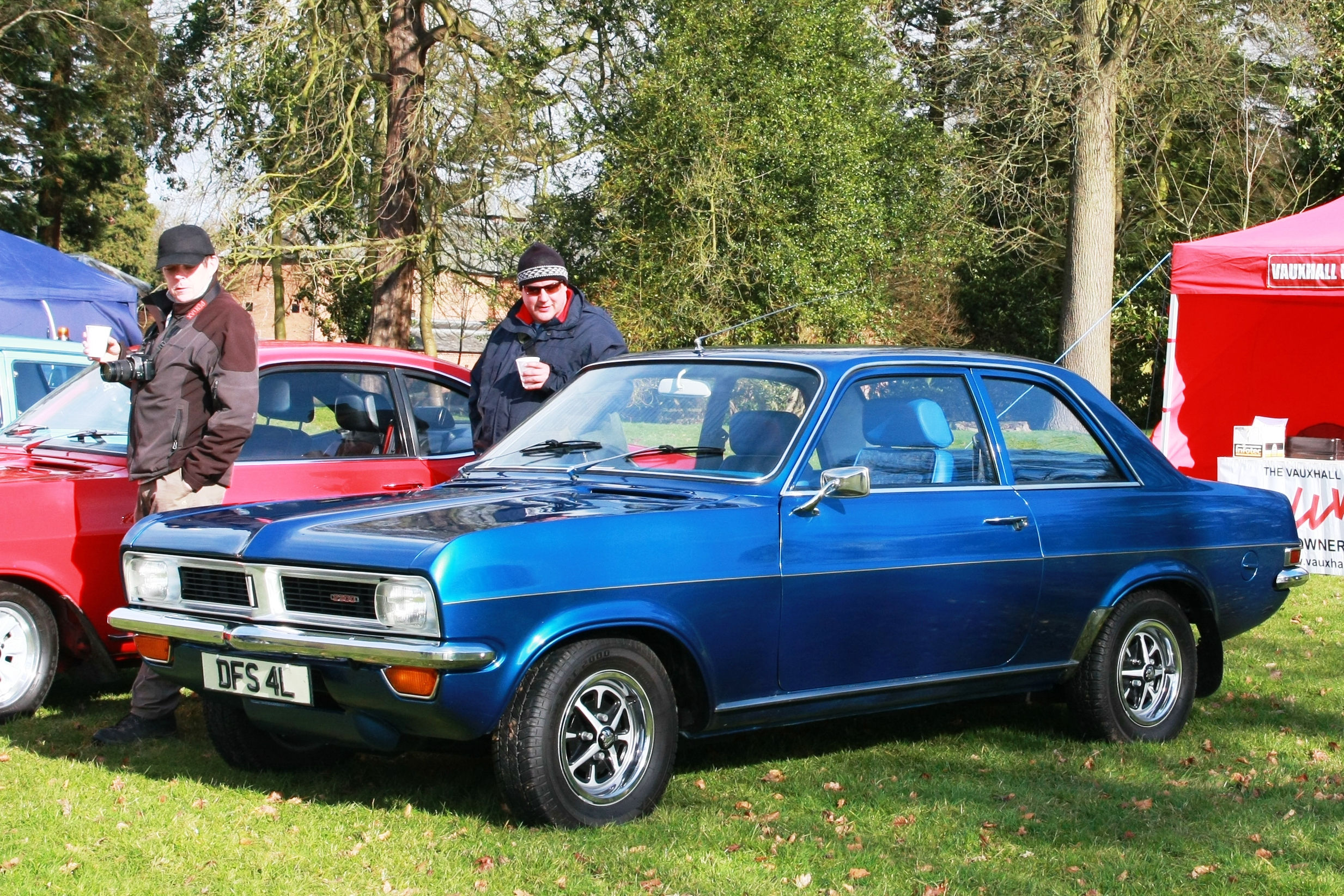
Vauxhall Viva 2300 SL HC

For 1977, the SL was replaced by the GLS, essentially marrying the plusher Magnum trim and equipment with the base 1,256 cc pushrod ohv engine. These models all had the full seven dial instrument panel, velour seating and Rostyle wheels, among many other upgrades.

Viva production was scaled down after the launch of the Chevette in spring 1975. Originally a three-door hatchback (also sold as the Opel Kadett City), the Chevette later offered two- and four-door saloons and as of 1976 a three-door estate which all but usurped the Viva's position as Vauxhall's small car entry. Nonetheless, the Viva remained on sale until the latter part of 1979.

The Viva was effectively replaced by the new Vauxhall Astra, a variant of the front-wheel-drive Opel Kadett. By that time it was dated in comparison with more modern rivals like the Volkswagen Golf. Production ceased at a time when European manufacturers were making the transition from rear-wheel-drive saloons to front-wheel-drive hatchbacks in the family car market.

The end of production of the HC Viva in 1979 marked a significant moment for Vauxhall, as it would ultimately prove to be the last car to be completely designed by the company with no input from Opel. The company's next car — the 1972 Victor FE range — was based on the Opel Rekord D; albeit substantially modified by Vauxhall and ended up having little interchangeable content with the Opel car. However, subsequent models (such as the Chevette — an Opel Kadett C with a restyled front end and the HC Viva's powertrain) would set the eventual precedent — that all future Vauxhall cars would be badge-engineered and German designed Opels, or in the case of the 2004 Vauxhall Monaro, a rebadged Holden.

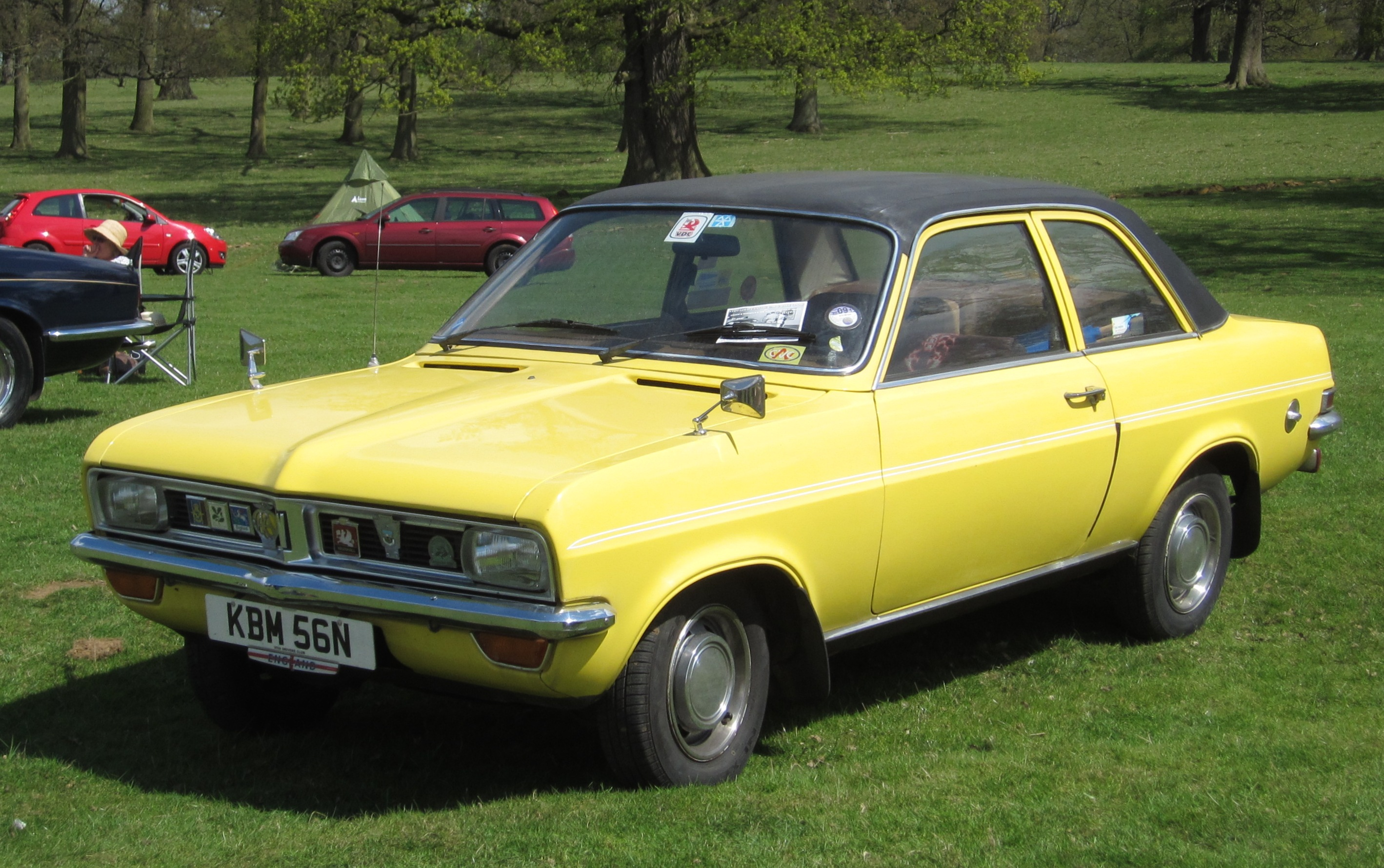
1975 Vauxhall Viva

The domestic market launch of the Viva HC coincided with one of the UK's periodic surges of debt fueled economic growth, and the latest Viva became Vauxhall's fastest selling new model of all time, chalking up its first 100,000 units in just 7 1/2 months. 640,863 Viva HCs were produced, making combined Viva production top the 1.5 million mark. The millionth Viva, a gold HC, was driven off the production line by politician John Eden amid much celebration on 20 July 1971. Although most Vivas were produced at Vauxhall's Ellesmere Port plant in northern England, the company's production lines were by the standards of the time flexible, and the millionth car was a product of the Luton factory. However, within seconds of the Millionth Viva's completion at Luton, Ellesmere Port celebrated what was described – over-optimistically as matters turned out – as the first Viva of the second million.

In New Zealand, the Viva was originally built in two- or four-door saloon and estate/van form with 1,159 cc and 1256 cc engines. For a short time a special New Zealand only variant was produced, called Viva Score 7. This was originally intended to have a higher performance engine fitted, as a sports model, but the accountants stepped in and it became just a "paint-job-and-trim" special. It was available in three colour schemes of lime green, bright red/orange and bright yellow, with extensive black stripes and a prominent "Score 7" logo on the rear mudguards. A batch of 1.8-litre models, some with automatic transmission, was imported from the UK in 1973/4 when the government temporarily relaxed import restrictions on built-up cars as local CKD plants could not meet demand. The 1.8-litre engine and automatic transmission later were added to CKD assembly and the entire range was renamed Magnum in 1976. This had the four headlight nose and improved trim and equipment, such as a two-dial instrument pack and heated rear window, in a bid to overcome the Viva's basic car image – its original place in the GM range now taken by a newly launched, wide range of locally made 1.3-litre Chevettes — and slowing sales. The Magnum also had an 1800 engine option, often teamed with automatic transmission.

=== South African Chevrolet Firenza ===
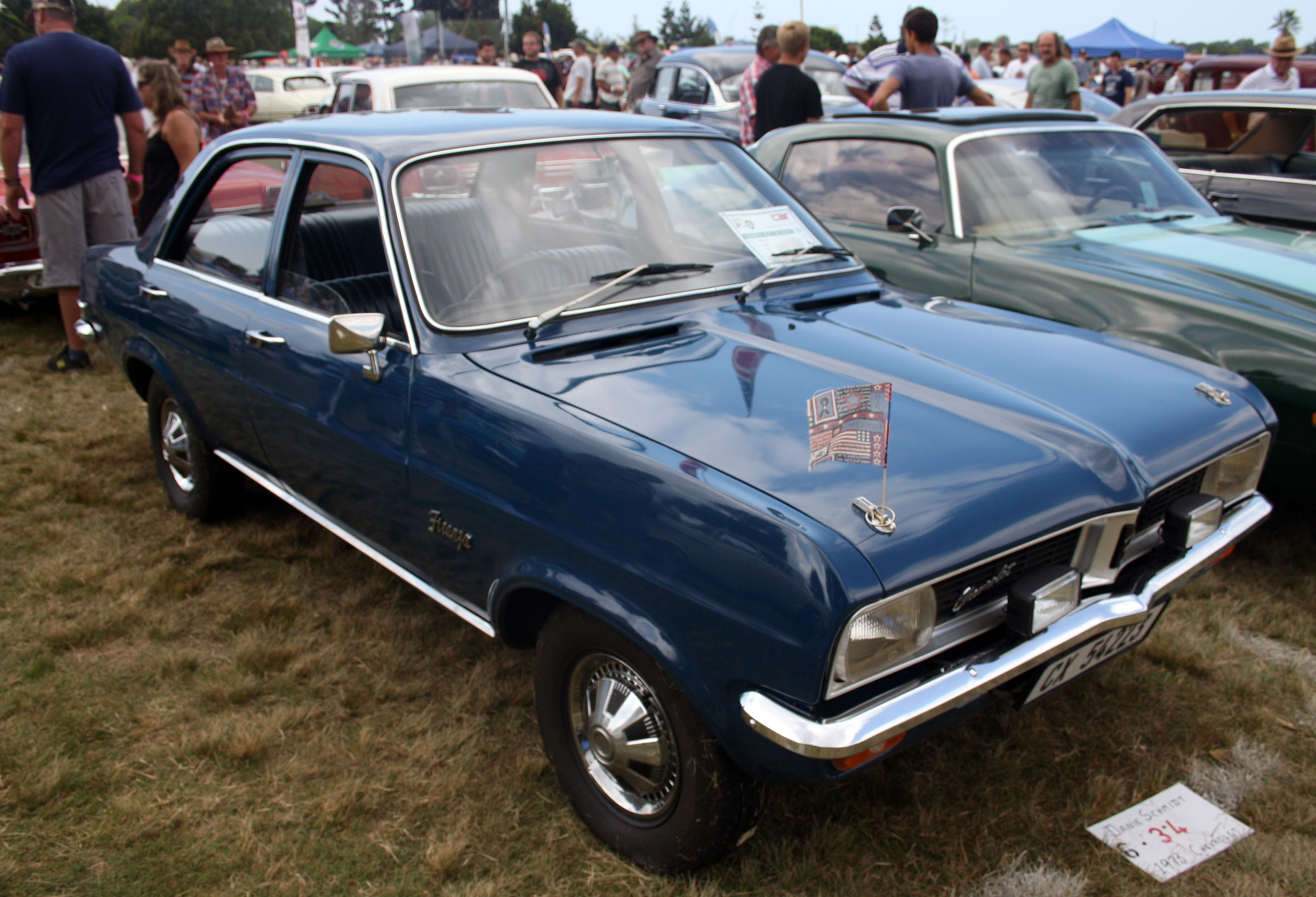
South African Chevrolet Firenza

A version of the Viva HC, called the Chevrolet Firenza, was produced in South Africa beginning in September 1971. This local derivative offered the small British four or a locally built Chevrolet 2.5-litre engine. After a 1975 facelift and some changes to the lineup, these lost the "Firenza" badges and were sold simply as the Chevrolet 1300 and 1900, as the smaller 1960 cc version had replaced the earlier 2.5. The car was facelifted, with a new front design which mimicked that of the bigger Chevrolet 2500/3800/4100, with the grille protruding somewhat and being set apart from the headlights. The Firenza range originally consisted only of four-door saloons, but South Africa also saw a three-door hatch developed off this rather than taking on the then new Chevette/Kadett City; this was first shown in June 1976 and the first car rolled off the production line in August. This mixture used the T-car's rear hatch and taillights, but was a Viva ahead of the B-pillars. The arch around the rear hatch opening was considerably stronger than the T-car's, to suit local road conditions. Also, the 57 L (15 US gal) was larger than one would expect from a car this size, to suit local road conditions and petrol sales restrictions. The split rear-seat folded down. With the new Chevrolet Chevair recently introduced, cost prohibitions made such a creation a better proposition than bringing in an all-new car.

Local parts content was high from the get-go, with some Hatch models reaching 71.15% right away. The car was 3,886 mm (153.0 in) long, 252 mm shorter than the saloon. Since the Hatch's bodywork was a modification of an existing design, some compromises were necessary and the load area was particularly shallow. Another problem, common to all 1300/1900s, was the absence of a universal key — period road testers offered many complaints about requiring no less than four hard-to-tell keys.

The 1300 has Vauxhall's 1256 cc engine, carried through from the Firenza, while the 1900 has a locally built 1960 cc Chevrolet cast-iron inline-four; a smaller version of the 2.5 seen earlier in the Firenza. At the time of introduction, the Weber carburetted manual 1900 claimed 80 kW (109 PS; 107 hp) SAE and a top speed of 149 km/h (93 mph) for the Hatch. Automatics received a Rochester carburettor and more torque-oriented tuning; max power for this version is 78 kW (106 PS; 105 hp). The 1300 and 1900 were both available in De Luxe or LS trim, with a four-speed manual transmission and an available three-speed automatic for the 1900s. Claimed power outputs later dropped to 44 and 68 kW (60 and 92 PS; 59 and 91 hp) for the 1300 and 1900 respectively; presumably these are net outputs unlike the earlier gross numbers.

=== Canadian Firenza ===
From 1971 to 1973, the Viva was sold in Canada as the "Firenza" through Pontiac dealers. While the HB used the Viva nameplate in Canada, the HC was renamed the "Firenza" in response to quality problems the previous generation Viva had, as well as to hide its British origins. The Firenza was plagued with significant quality problems which were made worse with the lack of availability of spare parts due to the frequent labour strikes in the UK at the time. Some of the Firenza's common problems included brake failure and engine fires. In 1972, angry Firenza owners organized into the "Dissatisfied Firenza Owners Association" and engaged in public demonstrations to publicize the car's quality problems and demand compensation from General Motors for repair costs and depreciation; the Firenza had become so toxic on the used car market that one year old examples with low mileage were worth less than a quarter of their MSRP and dealerships refused to take them as trade-ins. Multiple Firenzas caught on fire during a protest outside of the Canadian House of Commons. The protests, combined with reports of a 19-year-old woman perishing in an accident caused by her Firenza's steering failing prompted intervention by the Canadian government, while GM denied the problems and attempted to protect the Firenza's reputation through deceptive marketing before withdrawing it from the Canadian market in early 1973. The Disaffected Firenza Owners Association attempted to sue General Motors, but their lawsuit was unable to proceed as Canada didn't have any laws establishing class-action lawsuits at the time, prompting Prime Minister Pierre Trudeau to oversee their creation. The failure of the Firenza hurt Vauxhall, which considered Canada an important export market but was forced to withdraw from as a result. In a 2018 retrospective, Autofocus.ca described the Firenza as "the worst car Canada ever saw" and claimed that its obscurity outside of Canada is the only thing preventing it from being considered one of the all-time worst cars alongside the likes of the Chevrolet Vega and Ford Pinto, while also describing it as Canada's equivalent of Ralph Nader and the Chevrolet Corvair.

=== Grumett ===
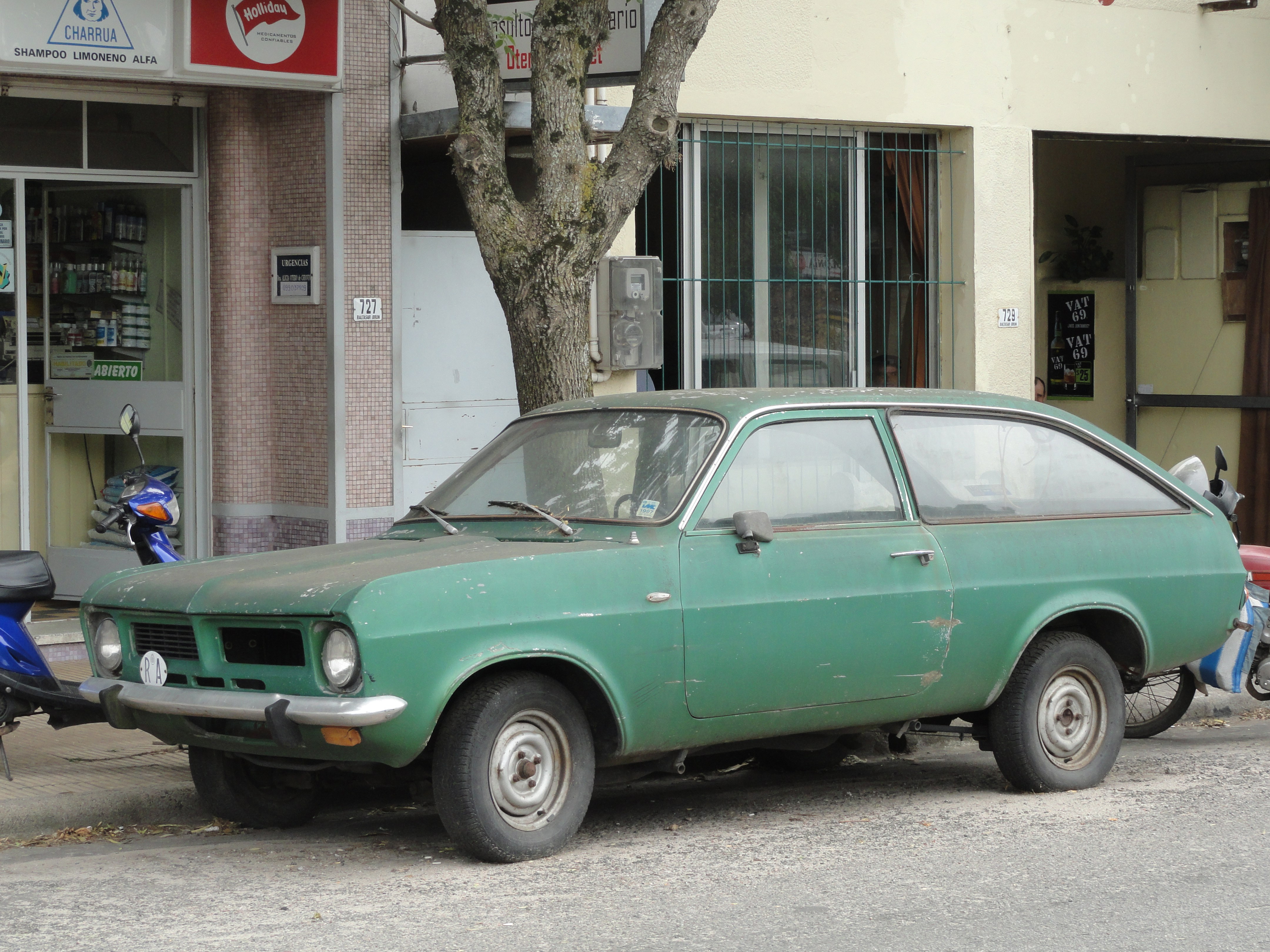
Grumett Indiana, made in Uruguay

Several cars based on the Vauxhall Viva were produced from 1970 until 1976 by Grumett in Uruguay.

They came in different models, including a double-cab, two-door pick-up, with different Vauxhall and Opel engines. The body was fibreglass; some original Vauxhalls were imported to serve as moulds. Mechanicals were either Vauxhall or Opel, depending on the batch.

== Name revival ==
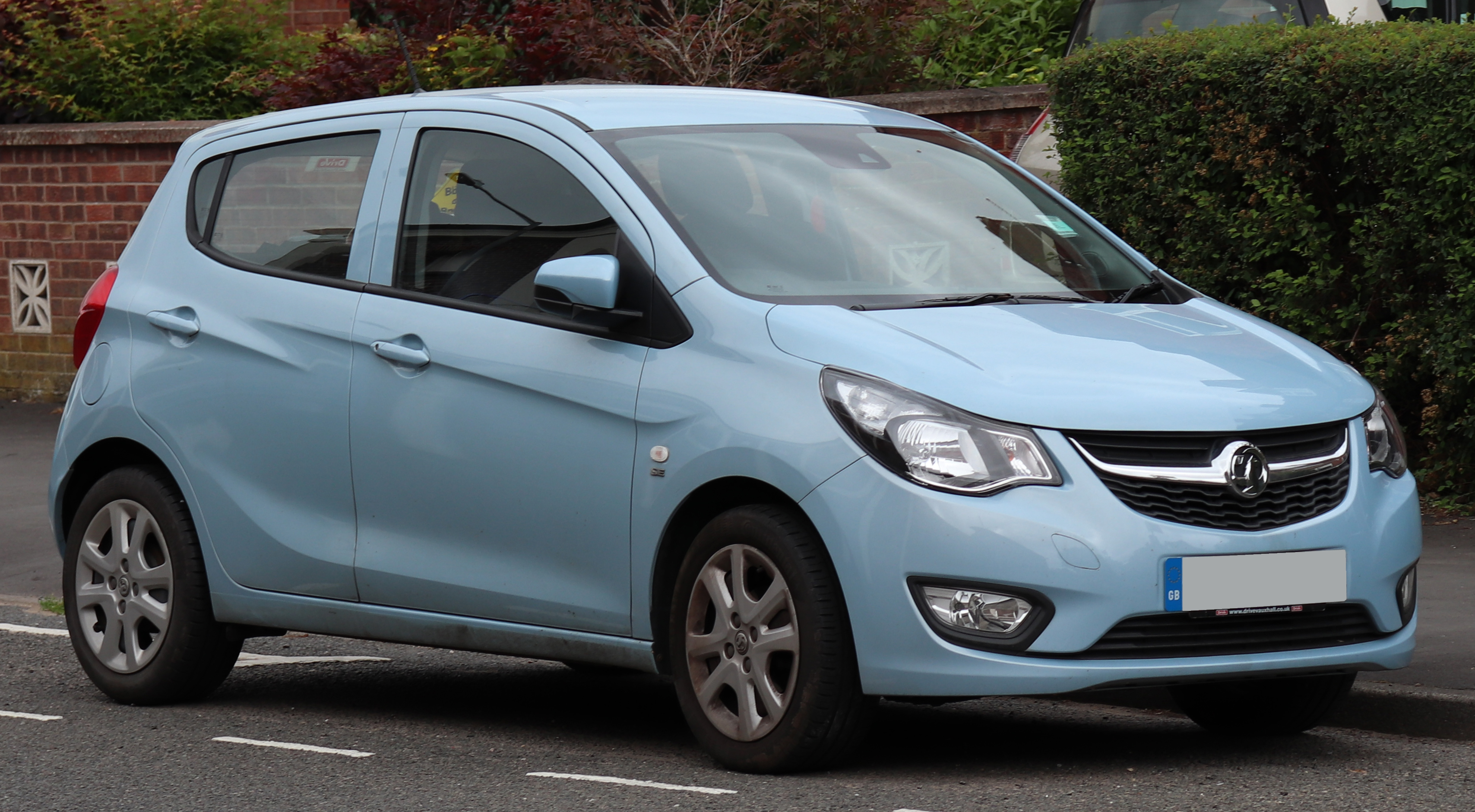
2016 Vauxhall Viva SE

In 2004, in cooperation with Lada manufacturer AutoVAZ, General Motors launched the GM-AvtoVAZ Chevrolet Viva in Russia. This was essentially a four-door Opel Astra G (the model which was introduced as a Vauxhall/Opel in 1998 and was produced until 2004).

The name was also used by Holden in Australia and New Zealand on versions of the Daewoo Lacetti and Nubira which were marketed as the Holden Viva.

The Viva name returned in 2015, as a Vauxhall model for the United Kingdom. This is based on the Korean designed and manufactured Chevrolet Spark, which was marketed as the Opel Karl in most of Europe, 2015–2019. It replaced the Vauxhall Agila. The Viva was discontinued in 2019.
