= Barry Seton =

Australian racing driver (1936–2026)

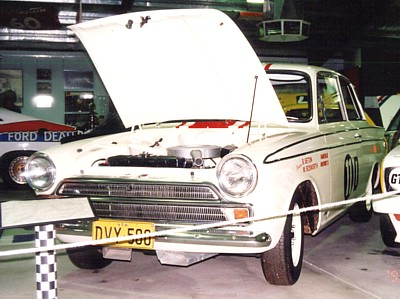
The Ford Cortina GT500 in which Seton and Midge Bosworth won the 1965 Armstrong 500 at Bathurst

George Barry "Bo" Seton (5 October 1936 – 17 April 2026) was an Australian racing driver. He won the Bathurst 500 in 1965 with co-driver Midge Bosworth driving a Ford Cortina GT500. He competed in the Bathurst 500 (and later 1000 km) 22 times, competing every year from 1963 to 1984, and completing the race in fifteen of those. In addition to his outright win in 1965, he won his class at Bathurst (co-driven on each occasion by Don Smith) in 1976, 1977 and 1980.

== Biography ==
Seton, who suffered from polio as a child, was particularly noted for his mastery of the Ford Capri in the mid-1970s, registering not only the class wins at Bathurst, but also winning the Sun-7 Rothmans 3-Litre Series three times at Amaroo Park.

For his 21st Bathurst start in 1983, his co-driver was his son, Glenn Seton making the first of so far 25 Great Race starts and who would go on to become a two time ATCC winner. The pair were leading Class B by over a lap when their Ford Capri blew its engine resulting in a DNF.

Seton's last start, in the 1984 James Hardie 1000 was driving a Group A Ford Mustang paired with longtime co-driver Don Smith. The pair finished 20th outright and 3rd in Group A.

Seton later became known as an engine builder, firstly with the Peter Jackson Nissan Team building their turbocharged engines from 1986 until 1988 before Glenn formed his own team, Glenn Seton Racing in 1989. Seton joined his son and was chief engine builder of the teams Ford Sierra RS500s until the team switched to racing the V8 Ford Falcon in late 1992. Seton also built several customer engines, mostly for privateer V8 Supercar teams. He left his son's team after 1995 to give himself a new challenge. He was immediately snapped up by Longhurst Racing as their chief engine builder from 1996.

Seton retired from competition at the top level but still competed in some historic touring car races with his Historic Touring Car Mk.I Ford Capri as well as building both Capri and Holden Torana engines for various cars in Group 2 of the Touring Car Masters series, including the engine for Glenn's Group 1 1973 Ford Falcon XB Hardtop.

Seton died on 17 April 2026, at the age of 89.

== Career results ==
Season	Series	Position	Car	Entrant
1964	Australian Touring Car Championship	9th	Holden 48/215	BP Boomerang Service Station
1974	Australian Touring Car Championship	9th	Ford Escort Twin Cam	
1975	Sun 7 - Rothmans Series	1st	Ford Capri	
1976	Australian Touring Car Championship	3rd	Ford Capri	Barry Benson
1976	Rothmans Sun-7 Series	2nd	Ford Capri	
1977	Australian Touring Car Championship	12th	Ford Capri	
1977	Sun-7 Rothmans Touring Car Series	1st	Ford Capri	
1978	Australian Touring Car Championship	9th	Ford Capri	
1979	Better Brakes Under 3 Litre Series	1st	Ford Capri	
1980	Better Brakes Touring Car Series	1st	Ford Capri	
1982	Australian Endurance Championship	13th	Ford Capri	Barry Seton

=== Complete Bathurst 500/1000 results ===
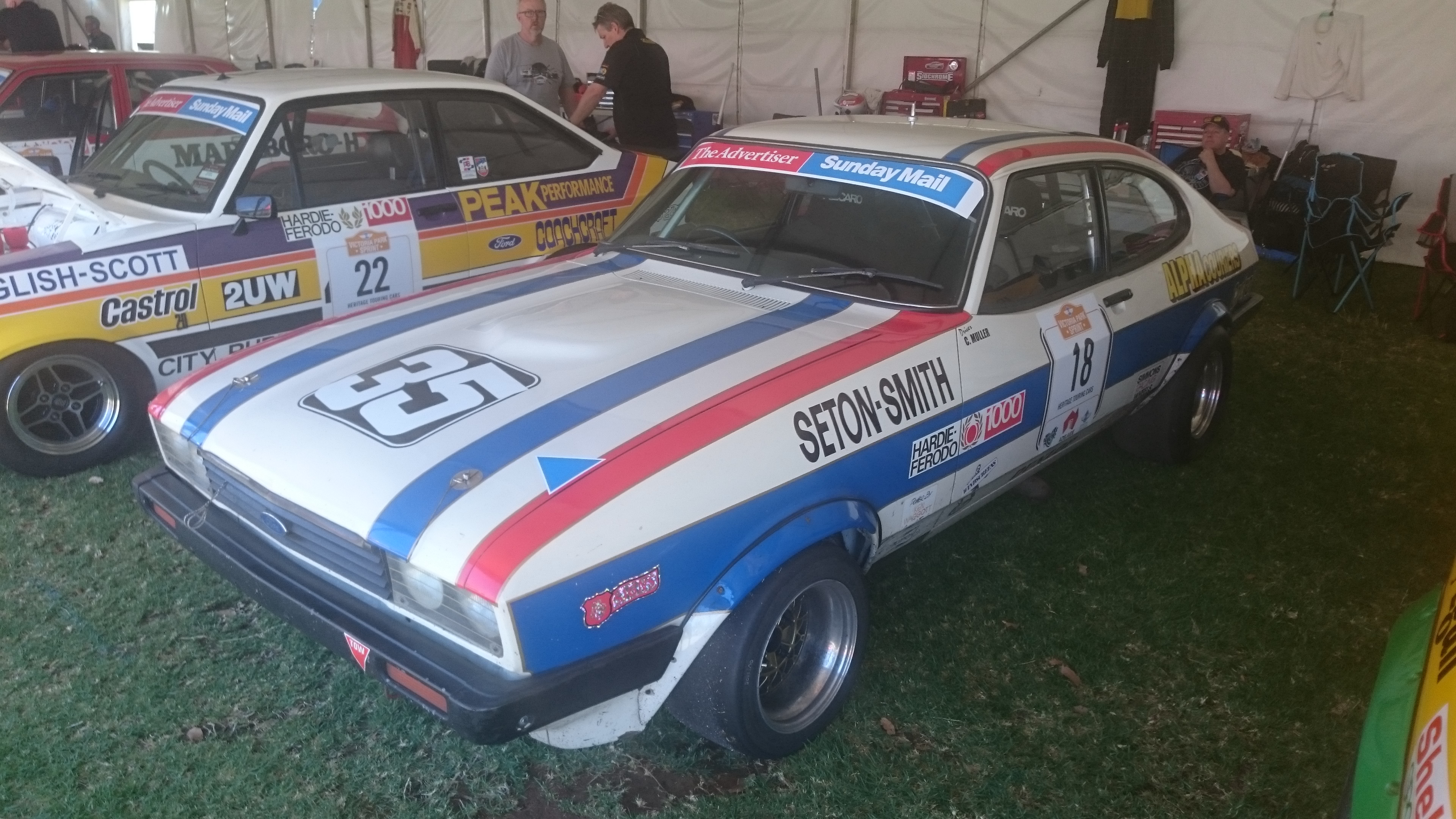
Seton won the 2000-3000cc class at the 1980 Hardie Ferodo 1000 driving a Ford Capri with Don Smith (image from 2017)

Year	Team	Co-drivers	Car	Class	Laps	Pos.	Class pos.
1963		(Australia) Herb Taylor	Morris 850	A	112	NA	7th
1964	(Australia) Fairfield Motors Pty Ltd	(Australia) Herb Taylor	Ford Cortina Mk.I GT	C	130	2nd	2nd
1965	(Australia) Fairfield Motors Pty Ltd	(Australia) Midge Bosworth	Ford Cortina Mk.I GT500	D	130	1st	1st
1966	(Australia) B Arentz	(Australia) Barry Arentz	Morris Cooper S	C	125	8th	8th
1967	(Australia) C Smith	(Australia) Charlie Smith	Morris Cooper S	C	127	6th	2nd
1968	Ford Motor Company of Australia	(Australia) Fred Gibson	Ford XT Falcon GT	D	113	31st	11th
1969	Ford Motor Company of Australia	(Australia) Fred Gibson	Ford XW Falcon GTHO	D	93	DNF	DNF
1970	Ford Motor Co of Australia	(Australia) Fred Gibson	Ford XW Falcon GTHO Phase II	E	33	DNF	DNF
1971	(Australia) Road & Track Auto Services	(Australia) Fred Gibson	Ford XY Falcon GTHO Phase III	E	32	DNF	DNF
1972	(Australia) Finnie Ford Pty Ltd	(Australia) Herb Taylor	Ford Escort GT 1600 Mk.I	B	116	15th	4th
1973	Ford Australia	(Australia) Fred Gibson	Ford XA Falcon GT Hardtop	D	17	DNF	DNF
1974	(Australia) WH Motors Pty Ltd	(Australia) Don Smith	Holden LC Torana GTR	2001 – 3000cc	56	DNF	DNF
1975	(Australia) B Benson	(Australia) Don Smith	Ford Capri Mk.I GT 3000	C	138	15th	3rd
1976	(Australia) Barry Benson	(Australia) Don Smith	Ford Capri Mk.I	2001cc - 3000cc	156	8th	1st
1977	(Australia) Amco Pty Limited	(Australia) Don Smith	Ford Capri Mk.I	2001cc – 3000cc	154	6th	1st
1978	(Australia) Amco Pty Limited	(Australia) Don Smith	Holden LX Torana SS A9X Hatchback	A	152	8th	8th
1979	Unipart Australia	(Australia) Don Smith	Holden LX Torana SS A9X Hatchback	A	148	7th	7th
1980	(Australia) Don Smith	(Australia) Don Smith	Ford Capri Mk.III	2001-3000cc	156	8th	1st
1981	(Australia) John Goss Racing	(Australia) John Goss	Jaguar XJS	8 Cylinder & Over	73	DNF	DNF
1982	(Australia) Barry Seton	(Australia) Don Smith	Ford Capri Mk.III	B	147	12th	2nd
1983	(Australia) Barry Seton	(Australia) Glenn Seton	Ford Capri Mk.III	B	134	DNF	DNF
1984	(Australia) Nu-Truck Spares	(Australia) Don Smith	Ford Mustang GT	Group A	136	20th	3rd

Sporting positions
Preceded by Bob Jane; George Reynolds	Winner of the Bathurst 500; 1965 (with Midge Bosworth)	Succeeded by Bob Holden; Rauno Aaltonen
