= Midge Bosworth =

Australian racing driver (born 1941)

Midge Bosworth (born 23 June 1941) is a former Australian racing driver.

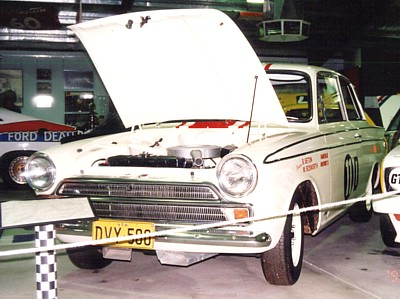
The Ford Cortina GT500 in which Bosworth and Barry Seton won the 1965 Armstrong 500 at Bathurst

Bosworth raced in the 1960s and is most remembered for winning the 1965 Bathurst 500, co-driving with Barry Seton in a Fairfield Motors entered Ford Cortina GT500. It was Bosworth's second, and last, start in the Bathurst 500, giving him the distinction along with Harry Firth (1967) and Graeme Bailey (1986), of winning the event in his last drive at Mount Panorama.

Bosworth was only 24 when he won Bathurst in 1965. He held the honour of being the youngest driver to win the race for no less than 31 years, until Craig Lowndes won the 1996 AMP Bathurst 1000 in a Holden Commodore (VR) when he was 22.

== Notes ==
Sporting positions
Preceded by Bob Jane; George Reynolds	Winner of the Bathurst 500; 1965 (with Barry Seton)	Succeeded by Bob Holden; Rauno Aaltonen
