= 1976 Rothmans Sun-7 Series =

Motor racing competition for Touring Cars of under 3 litre capacity

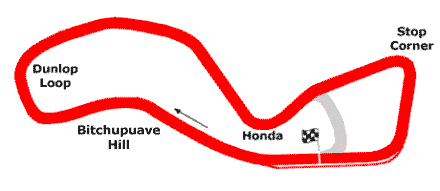
Layout of the Amaroo Park Raceway

The 1976 Rothmans Sun-7 Series was a motor racing competition open to Touring Cars of under 3 litre capacity. It was contested at the Amaroo Park circuit in New South Wales, Australia and was the sixth annual Touring Car series to be staged at that circuit. It was won by Allan Grice driving a Mazda RX-3.

== Schedule ==
The series was contested over four rounds with preliminary heats and a 50 lap final at each round.

Round	Date	Winner of Final	Car
1	7 March	Barry Seton	Ford Capri V6
2	30 May	Barry Seton	Ford Capri V6
3	18 July	Allan Grice	Mazda RX-3
4	15 August	Lakis Manticas	Ford Capri V6

== Series results ==
Position	Driver	Car	Entrant	R1	R2	R3	R4	Total
1	Allan Grice	Mazda RX-3	Mazda House	3	3	4 ½	5	15 ½
2	Barry Seton	Ford Capri V6		4 ½	4 ½	1 ½	-	10 ½
3	Bob Morris	Triumph Dolomite Sprint	Ron Hodgson	2	-	-	6	8
4	Lakis Manticas	Ford Capri V6		-	-	-	7 ½	7 ½
5	Don Holland	Mazda RX-3		1 ½	-	3	2 ½	7
6	Phil McDonell	Alfa Romeo 2000 GTV		-	-	2	4	6
7	Lyndon Arnel	Ford Escort RS2000		-	3	-	2	5
8	Bob Holden	Ford Escort RS2000		3	1	-	-	4
9	Bill Stanley	Ford Escort RS2000		-	-	3	-	3
10	Geoff Leeds	Mazda RX-3		2	-	-	-	2
11	Russell Skaife	Ford Capri V6		-	1 ½	-	-	1 ½
12	Peter Granger	BMW 2002		1	-	-	-	1
13	Terry Daley	Ford Escort Twin Cam		-	-	1	-	1
