= 1969 Sandown Three Hour Datsun Trophy Race =

The 1969 Sandown Three Hour Datsun Trophy Race was an endurance race for Series Production Touring Cars staged at the Sandown circuit in Victoria, Australia on 14 September 1969. It was the fourth running of the race which was to become the Sandown 500.

The race was won by Allan Moffat and John French driving a Ford XW Falcon GTHO.

== Classes ==
Each car competed in one of five classes:

- Class A : Up to $1850
- Class B : $1851 to $2250
- Class C : $2251 to $3000
- Class D : $3001 to $4500
- Class E : Over $4500

== Results ==
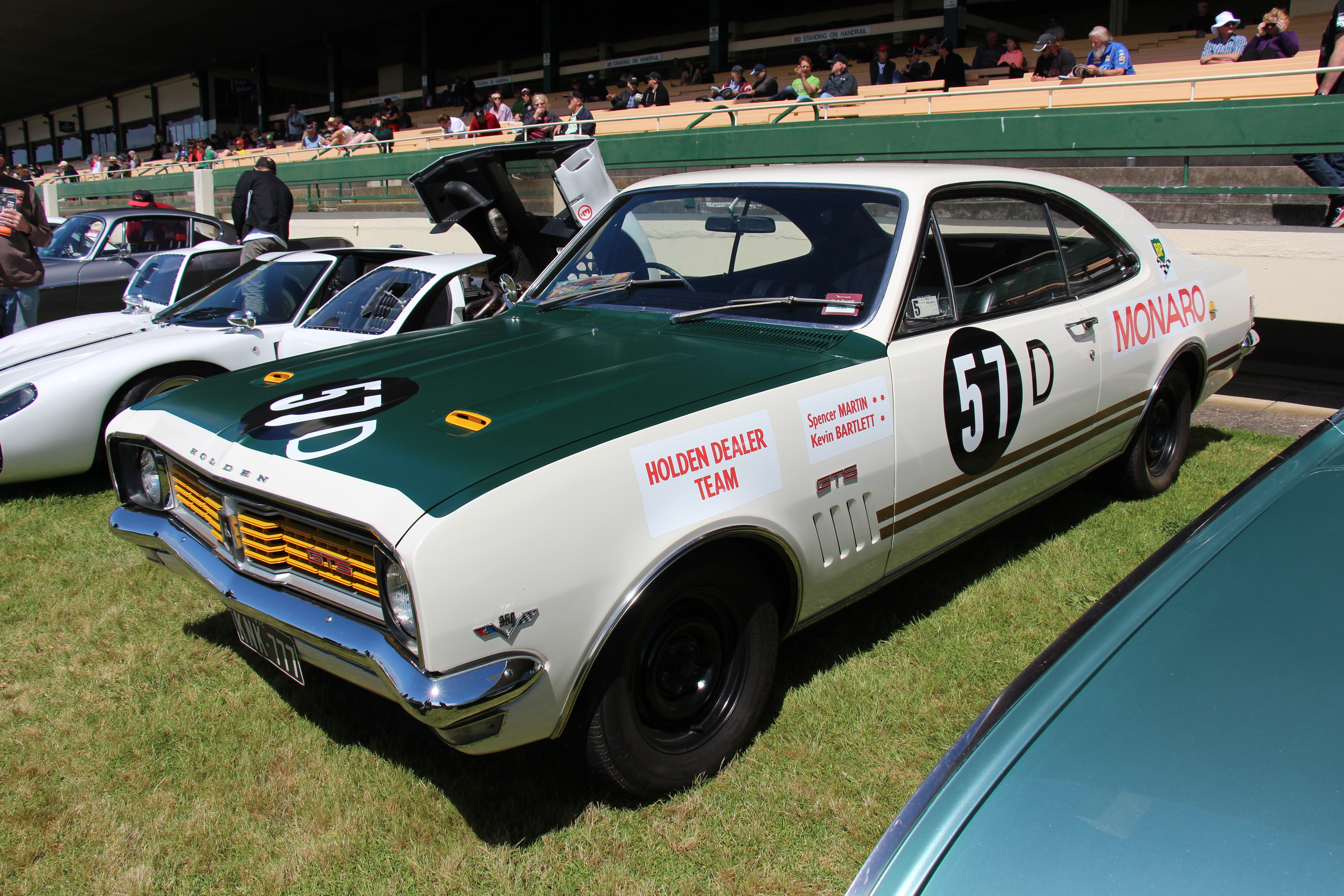
The Holden HT Monaro GTS 350 driven in the race by Spencer Martin and Kevin Bartlett. The car is pictured at the Sandown circuit in 2014.

Position	Drivers	No.	Car	Entrant	Laps
1	Allan Moffat; John French	61	Ford XW Falcon GTHO	Ford Motor Company of Australia	118
2	Tom Roddy; Murray Carter	64	Ford XW Falcon GTHO	Bob Rollington Pty. Ltd.	117
3	Fred Gibson; Barry Seton	62	Ford XW Falcon GTHO	Ford Motor Company of Australia	116
Class A : Up to $1850
1	Bob Holden; Don Toffolon	6	Datsun 1000	Datsun Racing Team	100
2	Allan Johns; Warren Gracie	1	Hillman GT	Allan Johns	96
DNF	Bill Evans; Barry Tapsall	7	Datsun 1000	Datsun Racing Team	
Class B : $1851 to $2250
1	John Roxburgh; Doug Whiteford	8	Datsun 1600	Datsun Racing Team	105
2	Frank Coad; Jon Leighton	9	Datsun 1600	Datsun Racing Team	104
3	Alf Barrett; Mel Mollison	14	Morris 1500	R.G. Lanyon	101
?	Barry Robertson; Peter Harding	10	Datsun 1600	C.B.M. Motors Pty. Ltd.	
DNF	Rusty French	17	Hillman Gazelle	Eiffel Tower Motors Pty. Ltd.	
Class C : $2251 to $3000
1	Jack Nougher; David O'Keefe	38	Chrysler VF Valiant Pacer	Eiffel Tower Motors Pty. Ltd.	112
2	Glyn Scott; Des West	39	Chrysler VF Valiant Pacer	Eiffel Tower Motors Pty. Ltd.	112
3	D Yeates; Neil Edwards	45	Ford XT Falcon 500 V8	Bayford Motors Preston	111
?	Bob Brown; Ted Brewster	43	Chrysler VF Valiant Pacer	Max Manley Pty. Ltd.	
?	Paul Dyer; Alan Vincent	33	Morris Cooper S	Selby's Steering and Suspension Service	
?	Joe Camilleri; John Humphrey	32	Morris Cooper S	Ann Thompson	
?	Ron Simmonds; A McIntyre	29	Morris Cooper S	Ron Simmonds	
?	Clem Smith; Clive Millis	42	Chrysler VF Valiant Pacer	Clem Smith Motors Pty. Ltd.	
?	Bill Lord-Milne; A. Moore	36	Renault R16TS	Monaco Autos	
?	George Reynolds; John Mooney	37	Renault R16TS	John Mooney	
DNF	Frank Leggatt; Norm Blunt	31	Morris Cooper S	Lionel W. Cordingley	
Class D : $3001 to $4500
1	Allan Moffat; John French	61	Ford XW Falcon GTHO	Ford Motor Company of Australia	118
2	Tom Roddy; Murray Carter	64	Ford XW Falcon GTHO	Bob Rollington Pty. Ltd.	117
3	Fred Gibson; Barry Seton	62	Ford XW Falcon GTHO	Ford Motor Company of Australia	116
4	Terry Robertson; Graham Blanchard	59	Holden HT Monaro GTS 350	Terry Robertson Motors	
5	Bruce Rae; Russell Kramer	53	Holden HK Monaro GTS 327	Bruce Rae	
?	Pat Peck; Gloria Taylor	66	Ford XW Falcon GTHO	D. & P. Traders Pty. Ltd.	
DNF	Max Volkers; Lionel Ayers	56	Holden HT Monaro GTS 350	Midway Motors Queensland	
DNF	Spencer Martin; Kevin Bartlett	57	Holden HT Monaro GTS 350	Holden Dealer Team	
DNF	Peter Larner; Richard Knight	65	Ford XW Falcon GTHO	B. S. Stillwell & Co. Pty. Ltd.	
DNF	Ian Geoghegan; Leo Geoghegan	60	Ford XW Falcon GTHO	Ford Motor Company of Australia	
DNF	David McKay; Brian Foley	67	Ford XW Falcon GTHO	Alto Ford	
Exc	Bruce McPhee; Barry Mulholland	63	Ford XW Falcon GTHO	Bruce McPhee	
Class E : Over $4500
1	Bryan Thompson; Graham Ritter	82	Alfa Romeo 1750 GTV	Bryan Thomson Motors	111
2	T Roberts; John Ould	81	BMW 2002	John Ould Motors	108
3	Don Uebergang; Garth Rhodes	93	Alfa Romeo 1750 GTV	Bryan Thomson Motors	107
Exc	Ray Gulson; Peter Brown	80	Alfa Romeo 1750 Berlina	Canberra Speed Shop	

- Of the 41 cars which started the race, six have not been accounted for in the above table.
- The McPhee / Mulholland Ford Falcon, which was provisionally placed third outright, was excluded from the results as McPhee had exceeded the two hour maximum driving time allowed for each driver.

Preceded by 1968 Datsun 3 Hour Trophy	Sandown Three Hour; 1969	Succeeded by 1970 Sandown Three Hour 250
