= 1968 Sandown Three Hour Datsun Trophy Race =

The 1968 Sandown Three Hour Datsun Trophy Race was a motor race for Production Touring Cars, staged at the Sandown circuit in Victoria, Australia on 15 September 1968. It was the third race in the history of the event which was to become known as the Sandown 500.

The race was won by Tony Roberts and Bob Watson driving a Holden Monaro HK GTS327.

== Results ==
Position	Drivers	No.	Car	Entrant	Laps
1	Tony Roberts, Bob Watson	40	Holden Monaro HK GTS327	A.M. Roberts	116
2	Alan Jones, Clive Millis	42	Holden Monaro HK GTS327	A. Jones	116
3	Alan Hamilton, Tony Jones	53	Porsche 911 Sportmatic	Porsche Distributors (Aust-NZ) P/L	116
4	Don Toffolon, Tom Roddy	46	Ford Falcon XT GT	Motor Improvements / STP Sales	116
5	Doug Chivas, John French	51	Alfa Romeo 1750 GTV	Alec Mildren Racing Pty. Ltd.	115
6	Bruce McPhee, Barry Mulholland	44	Holden Monaro HK GTS327	Wyong Motors	113
	Class A : Up to $1800				
1	William Evans, John Colwell	1	Datsun 1000	Datsun Racing Team	105
2	Dick Sorensen, Bevan Gibson	2	Datsun 1000	Datsun Racing Team	103
3	Brian Reid, Dick Thurston	3	Toyota Corolla	A.M.I. Racing Team	103
?	Jon Leighton, Theile	10	Honda Scamp	Birchwood - Honda Racing	
?	Rodger Withers, Bruce Hindhaugh	6	Hillman GT	Imp Spares and Repair	
DNF	Brian Sampson, Barry Ferguson	4	Toyota Corolla	A.M.I. Racing Team	78
DNF	Bert Balfour, Jim Smith	9	Morris Mini Deluxe	Goulds Motors Pty. Ltd.	
	Class B : $1801 – $2250				
1	Jack Eiffeltower, David O'Keefe	23	Hillman Gazelle	Eiffel Tower Motors Pty. Ltd.	108
2	Fred Sutherland, John Ould	25	Datsun 1600	Datsun Racing Team	105
3	Bryan Thomson, Adrian Ryan	20	Ford Cortina 220	Bryan Thompson Racing	99
?	George Garth, Bruce Stewart	21	Datsun 1600	Peter Langwill Autos Pty. Ltd.	
?	Doug Stewart, Geoffrey Hopkins	22	Morris Cooper	Anderson B.M.C.	
?	Rusty French, A. Boddenberg	26	Hillman Gazelle	Vern Curtin Motors Pty. Ltd.	
DNF	John Roxburgh, Doug Whiteford	24	Datsun 1600	Datsun Racing Team	80
	Class C : $2251 – $3000				
1	Bill Lord-Milne, Derrick Smith	33	Renault Gordini	Monaco Autos	106
2	Nick Ledingham, Barry Hickson	34	Holden HR	Scuderia Avanti	104
3	Arthur Olsen, Warren Gracie	30	Morris Cooper S	A. A. Olsen	103
?	James Abbott, Ron Brownrigg	32	Fiat 125	Willys Motors (Aust) Pty. Ltd.	
	Class D : $3001 – $4500				
1	Tony Roberts, Bob Watson	40	Holden Monaro HK GTS327	A.M. Roberts	116
2	Alan Jones, Clive Millis	42	Holden Monaro HK GTS327	A. Jones	116
3	Don Toffolon, Tom Roddy	46	Ford Falcon XT GT	Motor Improvements / STP Sales	116
4	Bruce McPhee, Barry Mulholland	44	Holden Monaro HK GTS327	Wyong Motors	113
?	Murray Howard, Chris Brauer	47	Ford Falcon XT GT	Murray Howard	
DNF	David Dalton, Ken Lindsay	43	Holden Monaro HK GTS327	Australian Automobile Constructors	68
DNF	Ian Haynes, Dave Price	45	Holden Monaro HK GTS327	I. Haynes	32
DNF	Henk Woelders, David Bennett	41	Holden Monaro HK GTS327	Perfectune Automotive Services P/L	10
	Class E : Over $4500				
1	Alan Hamilton, Tony Jones	53	Porsche 911 Sportmatic	Porsche Distributors (Aust-NZ) P/L	116
2	Doug Chivas, John French	51	Alfa Romeo 1750 GTV	Alec Mildren Racing Pty. Ltd.	115
3	Raymond Gulson, Peter Brown	52	Alfa Romeo 1750 GTV	Canberra Speed Shop	112
?	Brian Foley, Laurie Stewart	50	Alfa Romeo 1750 GTV	Brian Foley Motors Pty. Ltd.	

Note: Given that there were 31 starters in the event, one starter has not been accounted for in the above results.

Preceded by 1966-67 Not Held; 1965 International 6 Hour Touring Car Race	Sandown Three Hour Datsun Trophy Race; 1968	Succeeded by 1969 Datsun Three Hour
