= Tony Roberts (racing driver) =

Australian racing driver

Antony Martin Roberts (17 November 1938 – 2000) was an Australian race and rally driver.

== Career ==
Roberts won the 1968 Datsun 3 Hour Trophy at Sandown in Melbourne with Bob Watson, giving the Holden HK Monaro GTS327 a debut victory. In 1969 Roberts, then a prominent rally driver competing for a major Holden dealership, and with just a single season of circuit racing experience, was invited by Harry Firth to join his newly formed Holden Dealer Team and went on to take victory co-driving with Colin Bond in the 1969 Hardie-Ferodo 500 HDT Holden HT Monaro GTS350.

Roberts and Bond won the 1970 Rothmans 12 Hour at Surfers Paradise, also in an HDT Monaro GTS350. Then Roberts drove a Holden Torana sports sedan which was used as a prototype for the Torana GTR XU-1 which debuted later in the year.

During the 1970 Hardie-Ferodo 500, Roberts was involved in a sensational incident late in the race when, after losing control, he launched his Ford XW Falcon GTHO Phase II backwards over Skyline before tumbling down the hillside.

Roberts made seven starts in the history of the Bathurst 1000, after his impressive debut with a third place (with Bob Watson) in 1968. Roberts (with Colin Bond) won Bathurst in 1969.

Roberts was the first three-time winner of Australia's Alpine Rally in 1966 (with Peter Haas as navigator), 1967 (with Peter Haas as navigator) and 1968 (with Mike Osborne as navigator).

Tony Roberts died in 2000.

Roberts was posthumously inducted into the Victorian Rally Hall of Fame in 2014. The award was accepted by his daughters Samantha and Tiffany.

== Personal life ==
Roberts was born Antony Martin, on 17 November 1938 at home in Walmer, Kent, England, the eldest of two sons.

In 1951 at the age of 12 years, Roberts, his parents and younger brother migrated to Australia as ten pound POMS. They settled in Melbourne.

Roberts attended Prahran Technical School and graduated at the end of year 10. He worked for a time at General Motors Holden as a draftsman.

In 1963, Roberts married Helen Marjorie Renfree, an accomplished equestrian.

In 1970, their first daughter Samantha Marjorie was born and in 1972, their second daughter Tiffany Elizabeth.

In 1976, Helen died at the age of 32 leaving Roberts to raise their young daughters single-handed.

Roberts continued to run and manage his own automative service business and later became a Saab dealer. Unfortunately in the mid-1980s, Roberts was forced to close his business and as a result, his mental health deteriorated.

Roberts suffered from mostly untreated clinical depression for the last 15 years of his life as a result of a cumulation of very challenging life events including widowhood and unresolved grief, single parenthood and the loneliness this entails, the difficult transition from sporting fame and accolades to a civilian life and losing his sense of identity with the closure of his business, at a time when men did not seek help and acknowledgement of mental health issues was taboo. Combined with type II diabetes that was poorly managed, Roberts died at home in 2000 at the age of 61.

== Career results ==
=== Complete Bathurst 500/1000 results ===
Year	Team	Co-drivers	Car	Class	Laps	Pos.	Class pos.
1968	(Australia) AM Roberts	(Australia) Bob Watson	Holden HK Monaro GTS327	D	129	3rd	3rd
1969	(Australia) Holden Dealer Team	(Australia) Colin Bond	Holden HT Monaro GTS350	D	130	1st	1st
1970	(Australia) The Tony Roberts Team		Ford XW Falcon GTHO Phase II	E	124	DNF	DNF
1971	(Australia) Dusting & Co Pty Ltd		Holden LC Torana GTR XU-1	D	125	17th	10th
1972	(Australia) Essendon Chrysler	(Australia) Lawrie Nelson	Chrysler VH Valiant Charger R/T E49	D	NA	DNF	DNF
1976	(Australia) Clemens Sporting Car Servies Pty Ltd	(Australia) Frank Porter	Alfa Romeo Alfetta GTAm	1301cc – 2000cc	149	16th	4th
1977	(Australia) Bill Patterson Racing	(Australia) Doug Chivas	Holden LH Torana SL/R 5000 L34	3001cc – 6000cc	154	7th	6th

=== Complete Sandown Enduro results ===
Year	Team	Co-drivers	Car	Class	Laps	Pos.	Class pos.
1968		(Australia) Bob Watson	Holden HK Monaro GTS327	D	116	1st	1st
1970			Ford XW Falcon GTHO Phase II	E	NA	NA	5th
1971	(Australia) Dustings of Burwood		Holden LC Torana GTR XU-1	D	124	3rd	2nd

Sporting positions
Preceded by Frank Gardner; Kevin Bartlett	Winner of the Sandown 3 Hour; 1968 (with Bob Watson)	Succeeded by Allan Moffat; John French
Preceded by Bruce McPhee; Barry Mulholland	Winner of the Bathurst 500; 1969 (with Colin Bond)	Succeeded by Allan Moffat
