= 1971 Hardie-Ferodo 500 =

Motor race in Australia

Seasons
- ← 1970 1972 →

Layout of the Mount Panorama Circuit (1938-1986)

The 1971 Hardie-Ferodo 500 was a motor race held on 3 October 1971 at the Mount Panorama Circuit just outside Bathurst in New South Wales, Australia. It was open to production vehicles competing in showroom condition, with the field divided into five classes based on the purchase price of the vehicle in Australian dollars. Although an outright winner was officially recognised, all other official awards were for class results only. The race was the 12th in a sequence of annual "Bathurst 500" production car races dating back to the 1960 Armstrong 500. The outright winner was Allan Moffat driving a Ford XY Falcon GT-HO Phase III.

The 1971 race is perhaps best remembered for Sydney driver Bill Brown's lucky escape after the biggest single car crash in the race's history. On lap 43, the right front tyre on Brown's Phase III GTHO Falcon burst at over 100 mph (161 km/h) on the approach to the daunting McPhillamy Park, which in 1971 had no runoff area on the outside of the track, just the earth bank with a fence made of three rows of railway sleepers on top of each other and attached to sunken steel girders, at the top. The Falcon barrel-rolled along the fence (with two marshals lucky to escape with their lives by only just scampering out of the way) and ended upside down after 3½ rolls. Brown was lucky because his seat broke in the first roll and he was lying flat in the car as it continued rolling. Amazingly his only injuries were a grazed shin and a black eye.

1971 will also be remembered as the year that Moffat had a stray cardboard Southwark Bitter carton attach itself to the front of his GTHO for a number of laps, blocking the car's radiator. Pit boards told him of the problem and the team attempted to call Moffat in for a quick stop to remove the carton, but Moffat, seeing no change to the engine temperature and no reduction in the car's performance, waved them off and remained on the track until his scheduled pit stop with the approval of Ford Works Team manager Howard Marsden.

== Class structure ==
Cars competed in five classes based on the purchase price of the vehicle in Australian dollars.

=== Class A ===
Class A was for cars costing less than $2,150. It was contested by Datsun 1200, Mazda 1300 and Toyota Corolla.

=== Class B ===
The $2,151 to $2,500 class had the smallest number of starters with just four cars: Datsun 1600 and Mazda Capella 1600.

=== Class C ===
The $2,501 to $3,150 class saw a mix of Ford Cortina, Ford Escort, 2.8 litre Holden Torana GTR, Honda 1300, Mazda RX-2 and Morris Cooper S.

=== Class D ===
The $3,151 to $4,350 class featured Alfa Romeo Giulia, the E38 version of the Chrysler Valiant Charger, Ford Falcon 500 and 3.0 litre Holden Torana GTR XU-1.

=== Class E ===
For cars over $4,350. Apart from a single Fiat 124S, the class consisted only of Ford Falcon GT-HO Phase IIIs.

== Top 10 Qualifiers ==
Pos	No	Team	Driver	Car	Qual
Pole	65	Ford Motor Co of Australia	(Canada) Allan Moffat	Ford XY Falcon GTHO Phase III	2:38.9
2	64	Ford Motor Co of Australia	(Australia) John French	Ford XY Falcon GTHO Phase III	2:41.9
3	66	Road & Track Auto Services	(Australia) Fred Gibson	Ford XY Falcon GTHO Phase III	2:43.3
4	57	Finnie Ford Pty Ltd	(Australia) David McKay	Ford XY Falcon GTHO Phase III	2:44.4
5	63	FF Newell & Son	(Australia) Bill Brown	Ford XY Falcon GTHO Phase III	2:44.7
6	62	Byrt Ford Pty Ltd	(Australia) Phil Barnes	Ford XY Falcon GTHO Phase III	2:45.4
7	69	Trevor Thiele Ford Pty Ltd	(Australia) Trevor Meehan	Ford XY Falcon GTHO Phase III	2:45.5
8	43	Geoghegan's Sporty Cars	(Australia) Leo Geoghegan	Chrysler VH Valiant Charger R/T E38	2:45.7
9	61	Baldwin Ford Pty Ltd	(Australia) Damon Beck	Ford XY Falcon GTHO Phase III	2:46.6
10	45	Reg Papps & Sons	(Australia) Bob Beasley	Chrysler VH Valiant Charger R/T E38	2:46.3

== Results ==
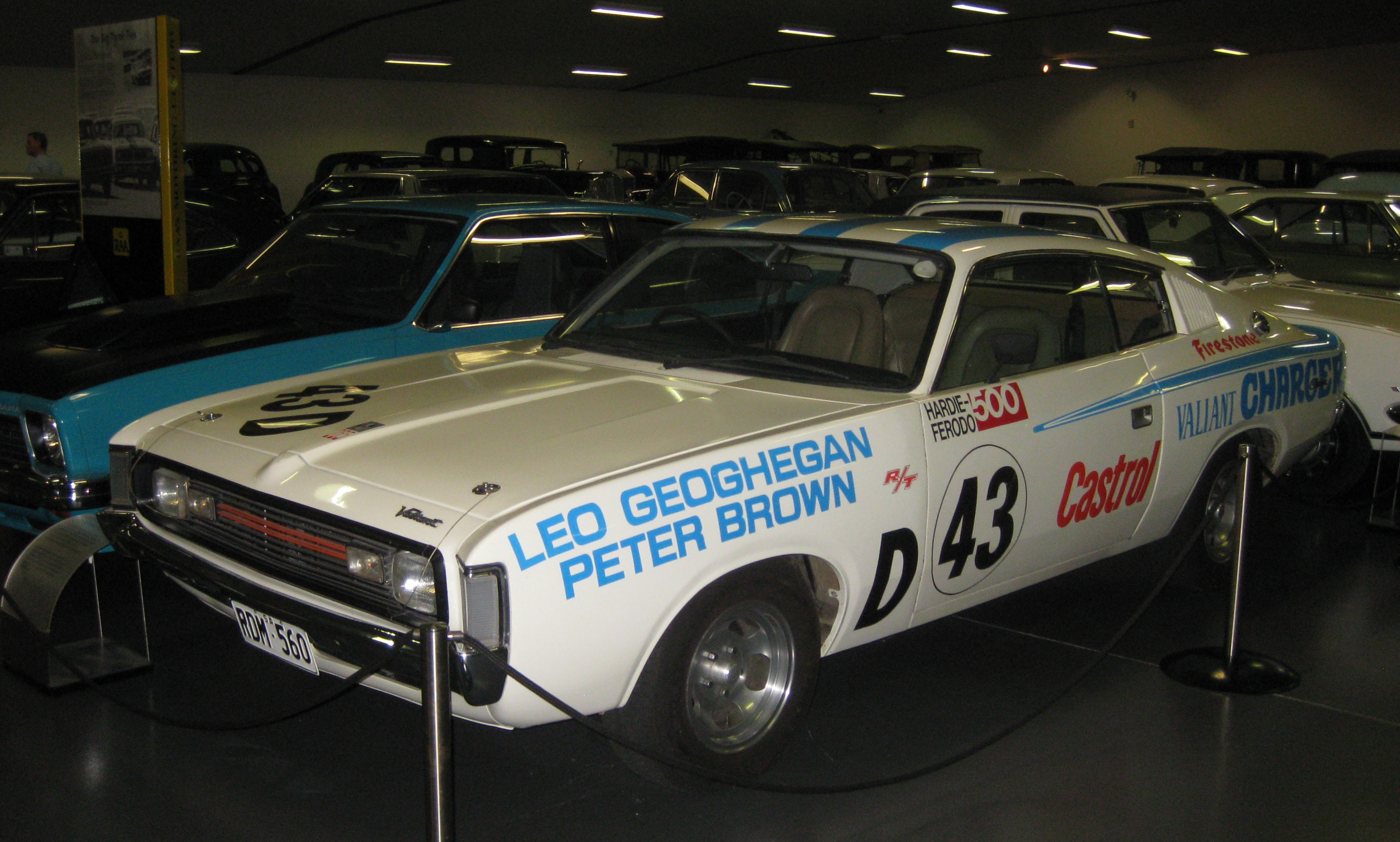
The Chrysler VH Valiant Charger R/T E38 of Leo Geoghegan & Peter Brown finished second in Class D in the 1971 Hardie-Ferodo 500.

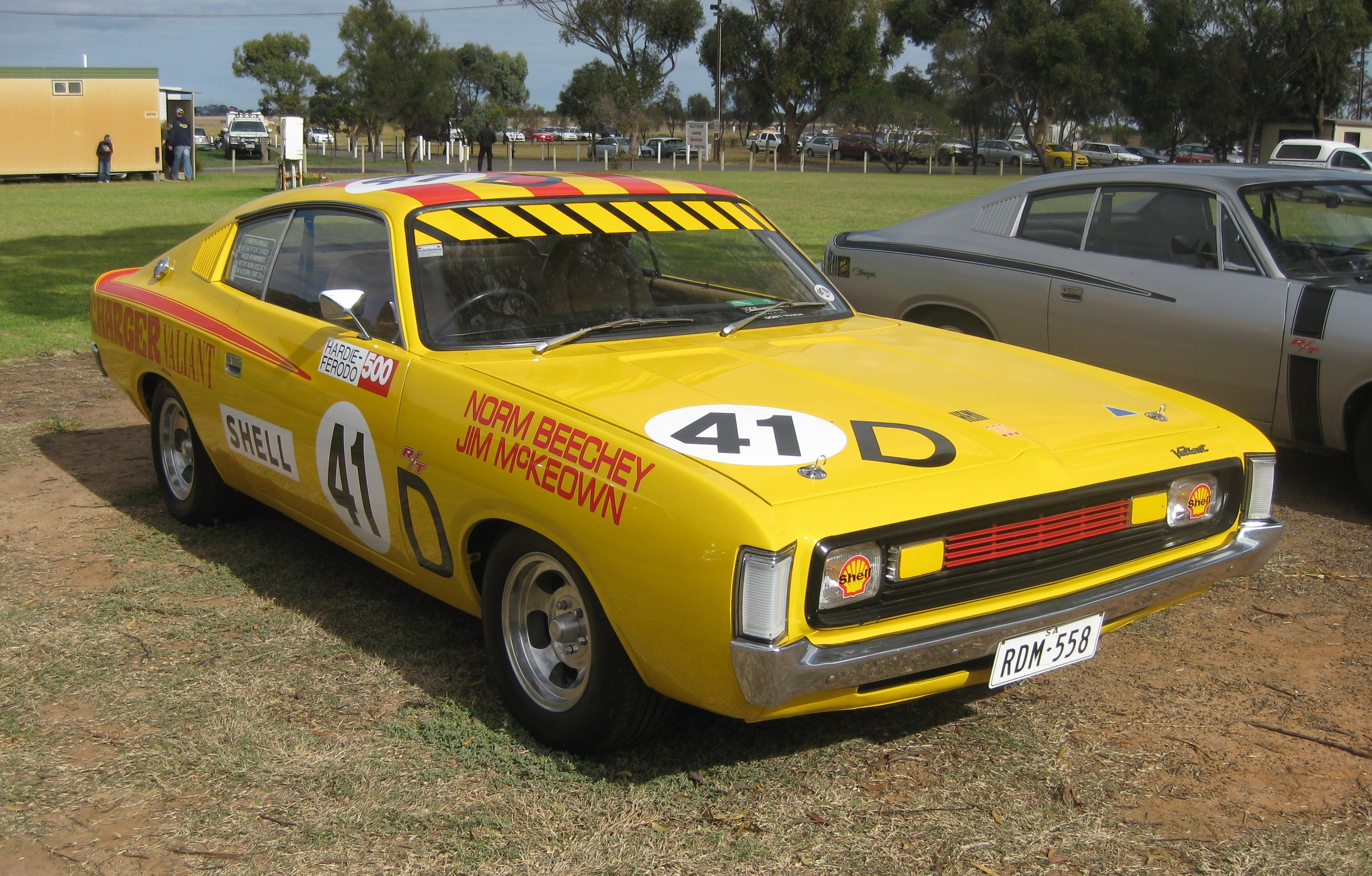
A recreation of the Chrysler VH Valiant Charger R/T E38 which placed 6th in Class D in the hands of Norm Beechey & Jim McKeown

Pos.	Class	No.	Entrant	Drivers	Car	Laps	Qual Pos.
1	E	65	Ford Motor Co of Australia	(Canada) Allan Moffat	Ford XY Falcon GT-HO Phase III	130	1
2	E	62	Byrt Ford Pty Ltd	(Australia) Phil Barnes (Australia) Bob Skelton	Ford XY Falcon GT-HO Phase III	129	6
3	E	57	Finnie Ford Pty Ltd	(Australia) David McKay	Ford XY Falcon GT-HO Phase III	129	4
4	D	31	Holden Dealer Team	(Australia) Colin Bond	Holden LC Torana GTR XU-1	129	15
5	E	64	Ford Motor Co of Australia	(Australia) John French	Ford XY Falcon GT-HO Phase III	129	2
6	E	60	McLeod Ford Pty Ltd	(Australia) John Goss (Australia) Barry Sharp	Ford XY Falcon GT-HO Phase III	129	17
7	D	43	Geoghegan's Sporty Cars	(Australia) Leo Geoghegan (Australia) Peter Brown	Chrysler VH Valiant Charger R/T E38	129	8
8	D	32	Holden Dealer Team	(Australia) Peter Brock	Holden LC Torana GTR XU-1	129	11
9	D	30	Max Wright Motors	(Australia) Brian Foley (Australia) Don Holland	Holden LC Torana GTR XU-1	129	22
10	D	45	Reg Papps & Sons	(Australia) Bob Beasley	Chrysler VH Valiant Charger R/T E38	129	10
11	E	59	J Harding	(Australia) Murray Carter	Ford XY Falcon GT-HO Phase III	127	21
12	D	41	Shell Racing	(Australia) Norm Beechey (Australia) Jim McKeown	Chrysler VH Valiant Charger R/T E38	127	19
13	D	28	Suttons Motors (Petersham)	(Australia) Bruce McPhee	Holden LC Torana GTR XU-1	127	32
14	E	55	Sinclair Ford Pty Ltd	(Australia) Kevin Bartlett	Ford XY Falcon GT-HO Phase III	126	30
15	D	40	Harvey Drew Pty Ltd	(Australia) Joe Butta (Australia) Geoff Hunter	Chrysler VH Valiant Charger R/T E38	126	24
16	D	49	Courtesy Motors	(Australia) Martin Chenery	Chrysler VH Valiant Charger R/T E38	125	18
17	D	29	Dusting & Co Pty Ltd	(Australia) Tony Roberts	Holden LC Torana GTR XU-1	125	36
18	D	39	City State Racing Team	(Australia) Johnnie Walker (Australia) Malcolm Ramsay	Holden LC Torana GTR XU-1	124	28
19	D	42	Liverpool Chrysler	(Australia) Doug Chivas (Australia) Graham Moore	Chrysler VH Valiant Charger R/T E38	124	16
20	E	67	Wright Ford Motors Pty Ltd	(Australia) Des West	Ford XY Falcon GT-HO Phase III	123	12
21	D	47	John McNicol Pty Ltd	(Australia) Gerry Lister (Australia) David Seldon	Ford XY Falcon 500	122	34
22	D	37	M Brown	(Australia) Mick Brown	Holden LC Torana GTR XU-1	121	33
23	D	34	The Commonwealth Ind. Gases	(Australia) Geoff Leeds (Australia) Digby Cooke	Holden LC Torana GTR XU-1	120	23
24	E	54	Zanardo & Rodriguez; Sales & Services Pty Ltd	(Australia) Ron Kearns	Fiat 124 Sport	118	35
25	D	38	L Seaton	(Australia) Brian Reed (Australia) Graham Ritter	Chrysler VH Valiant Charger R/T E38	118	26
26	C	17	G Cooke	(Australia) Gary Cooke (Australia) Garry Holmes	Mazda RX-2	117	39
27	C	27	Victorian Police Motor Sports Club	(Australia) Geoff Wade (Australia) Geoff Perry	Holden LC Torana GTR	117	40
28	D	44	Blue Point Motors (Management) Pty Ltd	(Australia) Graham Ryan	Chrysler VH Valiant Charger R/T E38	116	27
29	C	51	D&P Traders Pty Ltd	(Australia) Pat Peck (Australia) Jan Holland	Holden LC Torana GTR XU-1	115	61
30	C	19	Chas Tierney Pty Ltd	(Australia) Mal Brewster (Australia) Ray Strong	Holden LC Torana GTR	115	42
31	C	16	John Hile Ford Pty Ltd	(Australia) Ross Hewison (Australia) Brian Hones	Ford Escort Twin Cam Mk.I	110	45
32	C	22	Mazda Racing Team	(Australia) Wayne Rogerson (Australia) Alan Mayne	Mazda RX-2	113	37
33	C	25	Marque Motors	(Australia) Bob Cracknell (Australia) Bob Wedd	Morris Cooper S	111	47
34	C	24	H Vines	(Australia) Herb Vines (Australia) Chris Batger	Ford Escort Twin Cam Mk.I	110	45
35	C	20	Kloster Pty Ltd	(Australia) Geoff Westbury (Australia) Jim Sullivan	Ford TC Cortina 2000L	110	49
36	B	12	WH Motors Pty Ltd	(Australia) Bruce Stewart	Datsun 1600	109	51
37	A	6	John Palmer Motors	(Australia) John Leffler	Mazda 1300	108	53
38	A	8	Mazda Racing Team	(Australia) Les Carne (Australia) Peter Cray	Mazda 1300	107	57
39	A	5	AMI Racing Team	(Australia) Barry Arentz	Toyota Corolla 1200	106	59
40	A	7	C Kennedy	(Australia) Carl Kennedy (Australia) Bill Slattery	Mazda 1300	105	60
41	C	21	Bennett Honda Pty Ltd	(Australia) Ken Brian (Australia) Noel Riley	Honda 1300-S	104	56
42	C	15	Marque Motors	(Australia) Bill Stanley (Australia) Mike Kable	Morris Cooper S	102	44
43	A	1	Datsun Racing Team	(Australia) Doug Whiteford	Datsun 1200	100	52
44	B	14	Mazda Racing Team	(Australia) George Garth (Australia) John Hall	Mazda Capella 1600	99	46
45	B	11	WH Motors Pty Ltd	(Australia) Don Smith	Datsun 1600	97	48
DNF	E	61	Baldwin Ford Pty Ltd	(Australia) Damon Beck (Australia) Garry Rush	Ford XY Falcon GT-HO Phase III	117	9
DNF	A	4	AMI Racing Team	(Australia) Brian Sampson	Toyota Corolla 1200	102	58
DNF	D	50	R Lanyon	(Australia) Tom Naughton (Australia) Lawrie Nelson	Chrysler VH Valiant Charger R/T E38	98	25
DNF	D	48	B Thomson	(Australia) Bryan Thomson (Australia) John Mann	Alfa Romeo 1600 Giulia Super	80	43
DNF	E	58	Mark IV Car Air Conditioning	(Australia) Bob Morris (Australia) Ray Morris	Ford XY Falcon GT-HO Phase III	80	14
DNF	E	69	Trevor Thiele Ford Pty Ltd	(Australia) Trevor Meehan	Ford XY Falcon GT-HO Phase III	55	7
DNF	D	33	Bob Jane Racing Team	(Australia) Bob Jane (Australia) John Harvey	Holden LC Torana GTR XU-1	50	29
DNF	D	46	Bardahl International Oil Corp	(Australia) Bob Forbes (Australia) John Millyard	Chrysler VH Valiant Charger R/T E38	46	13
DNF	E	63	FF Newell & Son	(Australia) Bill Brown	Ford XY Falcon GT-HO Phase III	43	5
DNF	E	66	Road & Track Auto Services	(Australia) Fred Gibson (Australia) Barry Seton	Ford XY Falcon GT-HO Phase III	32	3
DNF	A	9	Mazda Racing Team	(Australia) Bernie Haehnle (Australia) Ray Kaleda	Mazda 1300	17	54
DNF	D	36	BS NcNaughton	(Australia) Scott McNaughton (Australia) Geoff Harvey	Holden LC Torana GTR XU-1	7	20
DSQ	C	23	Sinclair Ford Pty Ltd	(Australia) Alan Cant (Australia) Herb Taylor	Ford Escort Twin Cam Mk.I	115	41
DSQ	B	10	Datsun Racing Team	(Australia) John Roxburgh (Australia) Jon Leighton	Datsun 1600	111	50
DSQ	A	2	Datsun Racing Team	(Australia) Jim Laing-Peach	Datsun 1200	109	55
DNS	A	3	AMI Racing Team	(Australia) Bill Evans	Toyota Corolla 1200		
DNS	B	13	Harry Gapps Ford Pty Ltd	(Australia) Harry Gapps (Australia) Frank Hann	Ford Cortina 1600L		
DNS	C	18	Waterloo High Performance Tuning Centre	(Australia) Warren Gracie (Australia) Ron Gillard	Holden LC Torana GTR		
DNS	C	26	Harry Gapps Ford Pty Ltd	(Australia) R Kramer	Ford Escort Twin Cam		
DNS	D	35	L Grose	(Australia) Les Grose (Australia) Lakis Manticas	Holden LC Torana GTR XU-1		31
DNS	D	52	R Lanyon	(Australia) Lawrie Nelson (Australia) Tony Farrell	Chrysler VH Valiant Charger R/T E38		
DNS	D	53	Formula 1 International Motoring Pty Ltd	(Australia) Tony Allen (Australia) Len Searle	Chrysler VH Valiant Charger R/T E38		
DNS	E	56	McCluskey Ford Pty Ltd	(Australia) Ian Geoghegan (Australia) Brian Michelmore	Ford XY Falcon GT-HO Phase III		
DNS	E	68	G Ward	(Australia) Graham Ward	Volvo 164		
DNS	E	70	HG Fenton	(Australia) H Fenton (Australia) F Ure	Ford XW Falcon GT-HO Phase II		

== Statistics ==
- Pole Position - #65 Allan Moffat - 2:38.9
- Fastest Lap - #58 Bob Morris - 2:40 (lap record)
- Average Speed - 130 km/h
- Race Time of winning car - 6:09:49.5
