= Bruce McPhee =

Australian racing driver

- Nationality: Australia
- Born: Bruce Alexander McPhee; 11 February 1927
- Died: 22 September 2009 (aged 82) Central Coast, New South Wales, Australia

Championship titles
- 1968: Hardie Ferodo 500

Bruce Alexander McPhee (11 February 1927 – 22 September 2009) was an Australian motor racing driver. He is most famous for winning the 1968 Hardie-Ferodo 500 (now the Bathurst 1000), defeating both the Holden and Ford factory teams.

== Career ==
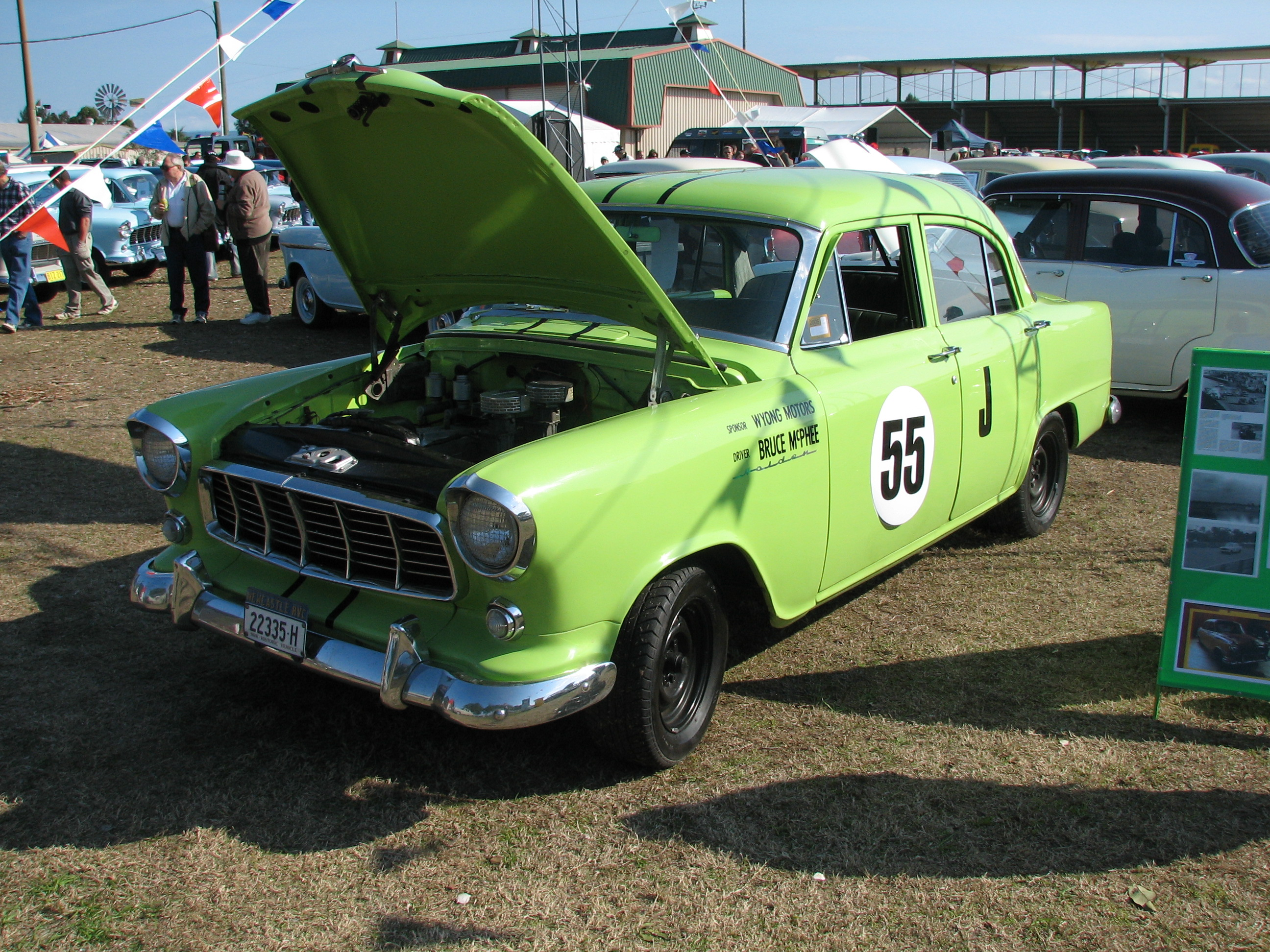
A reproduction of the Holden FE raced by McPhee in Appendix J Touring Car races in the early 1960s

At the 1968 Hardie-Ferodo 500, McPhee drove a Holden Monaro GTS327 painted yellow with black stripes with the number 13. His co-driver, who drove just one lap that day, was Barry Mulholland. McPhee would later claim in Australian Muscle Car magazine that an attempt to sabotage his Monaro was made the night before the race. As the race cars were road registered in that era, McPhee had driven the car back to his motel in Bathurst for the night. When he came out on race morning to fill the car with petrol, a number of tree leaves floated to the top of the filler. Luckily this was found before any potential damage could have put the car out of the race. The Monaro, supplied and sponsored by Wyong Motors, ran the race on one set of used, almost bald tyres, McPhee believing that they were faster than tyres with full tread (race regulations at the time stated the cars had to race on road tyres). Towards the end of the race track marshals around the Mount Panorama Circuit were reporting seeing sparks from the Monaro's Michelin tyres as they had worn down to their steel belts after almost 500 miles (800 km) of racing.

McPhee entered the 1969 Hardie-Ferodo 500 originally intending to run one of the new HT Monaro GTS350's, but when he received no help from Holden to do so he instead drove a privately entered XW Ford Falcon GTHO. Driving with Mulholland who again only drove one lap, the McPhee Falcon finished a close second at Bathurst to the Colin Bond/Tony Roberts HDT Monaro GTS350. Many, including HDT boss Harry Firth, believe that if not for an early pit stop to change a tyre after a clash with another car resulting in a late stop for fuel as they were out of sequence, McPhee and Mulholland would have won in '69 and made it back to back Bathurst 500's.

McPhee joined the Ford works team in 1970, driving in the South Pacific Touring Series early in the year, and was given his own Phase II XW GTHO to drive solo at the 1970 Hardie-Ferodo 500. Even though his car was still running near perfectly at the end of the 500 miles, McPhee finished second after following team orders not to pass his teammate, lead driver Allan Moffat.

As well as the 1968 outright win in the Holden Monaro, McPhee finished on the podium at Bathurst in 1963 (third) in a Ford Cortina Mk.I GT (the first year the race was run at Mount Panorama), 1965 (second) in a Ford Cortina Mk.I GT500, 1966 (third) in a Morris Cooper S, 1969 (second) in a XW Ford Falcon GTHO Phase I and 1970 (second) in a XW Ford Falcon GTHO Phase II.

McPhee also claimed the 1968 Hardie-Ferodo 500 pole position giving him the dual honour of being the first "Bathurst 500" race winner for Holden and the first "Bathurst 500" pole position winner for Holden.

== Personal life ==
McPhee lived the majority of his life on the NSW Central Coast until his death on 22 September 2009 at the age of 82.

== Career results ==
=== Complete Bathurst 500/1000 results ===
Year	Team	Co-drivers	Car	Class	Laps	Pos.	Class pos.
1963		(Australia) Graham Ryan	Ford Cortina Mk.I GT	C	129	3rd	3rd
1964	(Australia) Frank Delandro Motors	(Australia) Barry Mulholland	Ford Cortina Mk.I GT	C	126	6th	6th
1965	(Australia) Grawill Motors Pty Ltd	(Australia) Barry Mulholland	Ford Cortina Mk.I GT500	D	130	2nd	2nd
1966	(Australia) Regal Motors	(Australia) Barry Mulholland	Morris Cooper S	C	129	3rd	3rd
1968	(Australia) Wyong Motors Pty Ltd	(Australia) Barry Mulholland	Holden HK Monaro GTS327	C	129	1st	1st
1969	(Australia) Kloster Pty Ltd	(Australia) Barry Mulholland	Ford XW Falcon GTHO	D	130	2nd	2nd
1970	Ford Motor Co of Australia		Ford XW Falcon GTHO Phase II	E	130	2nd	2nd
1971	(Australia) Suttons Motors (Petersham)		Holden LC Torana GTR XU-1	D	127	13th	7th
1972	(Australia) Ron Hodgson Motors		Holden LJ Torana GTR XU-1	C	66	DNF	DNF
1973		(Australia) Tom Nailard	Holden LJ Torana GTR XU-1	D	41	DNF	DNF
1974	(Australia) Les Grose	(Australia) Les Grose	Holden LH Torana SL/R 5000	3001 – 6000cc	19	DNF	DNF

=== Complete Sandown Endurance results ===
Year	Team	Co-drivers	Car	Class	Laps	Pos.	Class pos.
1964	(Australia) Muirs Motors Pty. Ltd.	(Australia) Fred Morgan	Holden EH Special S4	B	201	11th	1st
1968	(Australia) Wyong Motors	(Australia) Barry Mulholland	Holden Monaro HK GTS327	D	113	6th	6th
1969	(Australia) Bruce McPhee	(Australia) Barry Mulholland	Ford XW Falcon GTHO	D	N/A	Exc	Exc
1970	(Australia) Ford Motor Company		Ford XW Falcon GTHO Phase II	E	119	10th	3rd
1971	(Australia) Kevin Dennis Motors		Holden LC Torana GTR XU-1	D	124	4th	3rd
1972	(Australia) Ron Hodgson Motors		Holden LJ Torana GTR XU-1	C	123	6th	3rd

Sporting positions
Preceded by Harry Firth; Fred Gibson	Winner of the Bathurst 500; 1968 (with Barry Mulholland)	Succeeded by Colin Bond; Tony Roberts
