= 1970 Hardie-Ferodo 500 =

Motor race in Australia

Seasons
- ← 1969 1971 →

Layout of the Mount Panorama Circuit (1938–1986)

The 1970 Hardie-Ferodo 500 was the 11th running of the Bathurst 500 touring car race. It was held on 4 October 1970 at the Mount Panorama Circuit just outside Bathurst. The race was open to standard production sedans competing in five classes based on the purchase price of the vehicle (in Australian dollars).

Allan Moffat won his first Bathurst endurance race, leading home Bruce McPhee in a one-two result for the Ford works team and their Ford XW Falcon GTHO Phase II's. It was the fifth Phillip Island / Bathurst 500 victory for the factory team. Third, a lap behind the Fords, was Don Holland driving a Holden LC Torana GTR XU-1.

Defending winners Colin Bond and Tony Roberts drove separate cars in the event. Bond finished 16th in his Holden Dealer Team Torana GTR XU-1 after having led the early laps, while Roberts was lucky to survive a spectacular accident when his Ford Falcon GTHO crashed at Skyline only 6 laps from the finish. The Falcon spun backwards, leapt over the guard rail and rolled about 50 metres down the mountain before being stopped by a tree.

== Class structure ==
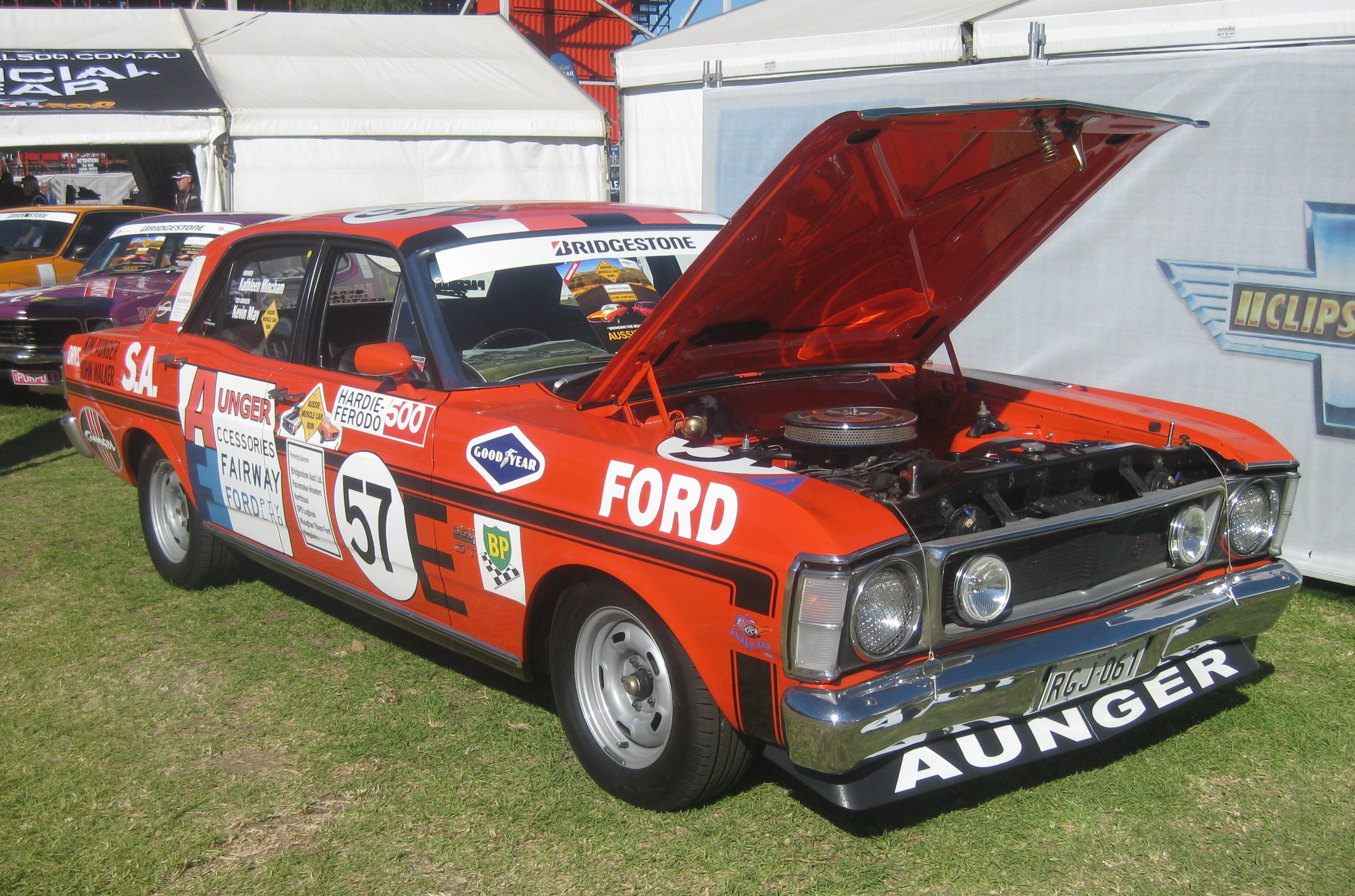
A race replica of the Ford XW Falcon GTHO driven by Kim Aunger and John Walker in the 1970 Hardie Ferodo 500

=== Class A ===
For cars up to $1,960. It was made up of Datsun 1200s, 1.3 litre Ford Escorts, Mazda 1300s and Toyota Corollas. A Datsun 1200 won the class with an average lap time of 3 minutes, 26 seconds.

=== Class B ===
The $1,961 to $2,400 class consisted of Datsun 1600, Fiat 128, Ford Cortina and 2.6 litre Holden Torana.

=== Class C ===
The $2,401 to $3,150 class saw a mix of two barrel carburettor Chrysler Valiant Pacer, 1.6 litre Ford Escort, 3.1 litre Holden Torana and Morris Cooper S.

=== Class D ===
The $3,151 to $4,100 class featured only the four barrel carburettor Chrysler Valiant Pacer, a Fiat 125 and a Triumph 2.5 PI although a Ford Capri was also entered but did not start.

=== Class E ===
For cars over $4,100. Apart from a single BMW 2800 and a Holden Monaro the class consisted only of Ford Falcon GTHO Phase II.

== Top 10 Qualifiers ==
Pos	No	Entrant	Driver	Car	Qual
Pole	64	Ford Motor Co of Australia	(Canada) Allan Moffat	Ford XW Falcon GTHO Phase II	2:49.3
2	63	Ford Motor Co of Australia	(Australia) Bruce McPhee	Ford XW Falcon GTHO Phase II	2:50.0
3	62	Ford Motor Co of Australia	(Australia) Fred Gibson	Ford XW Falcon GTHO Phase II	2:53.6
4	39	Holden Dealer Team	(Australia) Colin Bond	Holden LC Torana GTR XU-1	2:54.0
5	30	Max Wright Motors Pty Ltd	(Australia) Don Holland	Holden LC Torana GTR XU-1	2:54.3
6	40	Holden Dealer Team	(Australia) Peter Brock	Holden LC Torana GTR XU-1	2:54.8
7	67	The Tony Roberts Team	(Australia) Tony Roberts	Ford XW Falcon GTHO Phase II	2:54.9
8	56	Stillwell & Co Pty Ltd	(Australia) Graham Ritter	Ford XW Falcon GTHO Phase II	2:55.1
9	55	Finnie Ford Pty Ltd	(Australia) David McKay	Ford XW Falcon GTHO Phase II	2:55.1
10	60	Wright Ford Motors Pty Ltd	(Australia) Bob Muir	Ford XW Falcon GTHO Phase II	2:55.4

== Results ==
Pos	Class	No	Entrant	Drivers	Car	Laps	Qual Pos
1	E	64	Ford Motor Co of Australia	(Canada) Allan Moffat	Ford XW Falcon GTHO Phase II	130	1
2	E	63	Ford Motor Co of Australia	(Australia) Bruce McPhee	Ford XW Falcon GTHO Phase II	130	2
3	C	30	Max Wright Motors Pty Ltd	(Australia) Don Holland	Holden LC Torana GTR XU-1	129	5
4	C	35	Geoghegan's Sporty Cars	(Australia) Doug Chivas (Australia) Graham Ryan	Chrysler VG Valiant Pacer 2 Barrel	129	25
5	C	34	Geoghegan's Sporty Cars	(Australia) Leo Geoghegan (Australia) Nick Ledingham	Chrysler VG Valiant Pacer 2 Barrel	128	22
6	C	33	McLeod Kelso & Lee Pty Ltd	(Australia) George Garth (Australia) John Hall	Holden LC Torana GTR XU-1	128	19
7	D	51	Geoghegan's Sporty Cars	(Australia) Peter Brown (Australia) Des West	Chrysler VG Valiant Pacer 4 Barrel	127	11
8	C	31	Booran Motors Pty Ltd	(Australia) Brian Reed (Australia) Bob Watson	Holden LC Torana GTR XU-1	127	14
9	E	53	McLeod Ford Pty Ltd	(Australia) John Goss (Australia) Bob Skelton	Ford XW Falcon GTHO Phase II	127	32
10	C	28	Waterloo High Performance Centre	(Australia) Ron Gillard (Australia) Warren Gracie	Holden LC Torana GTR XU-1	126	30
11	C	37	Boyded Pty Ltd	(Australia) Bob Martin (Australia) Spencer Martin	Holden LC Torana GTR XU-1	125	16
12	E	66	Commonwealth Industrial Gases Limited	(Australia) Bill Ford (Australia) Hans Tholstrup	Ford XW Falcon GTHO Phase II	125	21
13	C	38	Holden Dealer Team	(Australia) Sandra Bennett (Australia) Christine Cole	Holden LC Torana GTR XU-1	123	24
14	E	65	Alto Ford Racing Pty Ltd	(Australia) Bob Holden (Australia) (Bill Fanning)	Ford XW Falcon GTHO Phase II	123	26
15	D	46	Central Motors (Nepean) Pty Ltd	(Australia) Bob Cook (Australia) Alan Cant	Chrysler VG Valiant Pacer 4 Barrel	121	31
16	C	39	Holden Dealer Team	(Australia) Colin Bond	Holden LC Torana GTR XU-1	119	4
17	C	36	Thomson Ford Pty Ltd	(Australia) Bob Drane	Ford Escort Twin Cam Mk.I	119	34
18	E	54	Rowell Thiele Ford Pty Ltd	(Australia) Trevor Meehan (Australia) Peter Wherrett	Ford XW Falcon GTHO Phase II	118	15
19	B	23	W.H. Motors Pty Ltd	(Australia) Don Smith (Australia) (Herb Taylor)	Datsun 1600	117	38
20	B	20	Datsun Racing Team	(Australia) Doug Whiteford	Datsun 1600	117	39
21	C	42	Muir Motors (Ryde) Pty Ltd	(Australia) Martin Cortese (Australia) Chris Cronan	Holden LC Torana GTR XU-1	117	29
22	E	58	Eiffeltower Group	(Australia) Jack Nougher (Australia) David O'Keefe	BMW 2800	117	33
23	D	47	John McNicol Pty Ltd; Zanardo & Rodriguez	(Australia) Ron Kearns (Australia) Gerry Lister	Fiat 125S	116	40
24	A	6	Datsun Racing Team	(Australia) Jon Leighton (Australia) Barry Tapsall	Datsun 1200	114	43
25	A	1	Denlo Motors Pty Ltd	(Australia) Bernie Haehnle (Australia) Neil Revell	Mazda 1300	114	47
26	A	12	John Palmer Motors	(Australia) Gary Hodge (Australia) John Leffler	Mazda 1300	113	45
27	A	10	AMI Racing Team	(Australia) Brian Sampson (Australia) Dick Thurston	Toyota Corolla	113	48
28	A	7	Mazda House Pty Ltd	(Australia) Barry Ferguson (Australia) Jim Laing-Peach	Mazda 1300	112	50
29	B	21	Kloster Pty Ltd	(Australia) Ray Marquet (Australia) Geoff Westbury	Ford Cortina 240 Mk.II	112	53
30	A	9	AMI Racing Team	(Australia) Max Stewart (Australia) Dick Young	Toyota Corolla	112	51
31	D	48	TVW 7 Perth; Artransa Park Television	(Australia) Brian Culcheth (Australia) Lyndon McLeod	Triumph 2.5 PI	111	37
32	A	13	Tynan Motors	(Australia) Ray Morris	Mazda 1300	111	54
33	A	4	Parry's Car Sales Pty Ltd	(Australia) Trevor Mason	Mazda 1300	111	55
34	C	32	Fair Deal Car Sales Pty Ltd	(Australia) Digby Cooke (Australia) David Seldon	Holden LC Torana GTR XU-1	108	13
35	A	14	C Kennedy	(Australia) Carl Kennedy (Australia) Bill Slattery	Datsun 1200	108	56
36	C	26	P & R Williams	(Australia) Lyn Keefe (Australia) Arthur Olsen	Morris Cooper S	107	57
37	C	40	Holden Dealer Team	(Australia) Peter Brock (Australia) Bob Morris	Holden LC Torana GTR XU-1	107	6
38	A	2	Marque Motors	(Australia) Bill Stanley (Australia) Mike Kable	Toyota Corolla	106	52
39	B	22	Grenville Motors Pty Ltd	(Australia) Peter Finlay (Australia) Bob Forbes	Fiat 128	106	58
40	C	43	BP Muirfield Service Station	(Australia) Ross Hewison (Australia) Brian Hones	Ford Escort Twin Cam Mk.I	105	36
41	A	8	Harry Gapps Ford Pty Ltd	(Australia) Harry Gapps (Australia) Frank Hann	Ford Escort 1300 Mk.I	103	59
42	A	15	Woman's Day	(Australia) Carole Corness (Australia) Gloria Taylor	Ford Escort 1300 Mk.I	103	60
43	D	49	J Butta	(Australia) Joe Butta (Australia) Bob Genders	Chrysler VG Valiant Pacer 4 Barrel	63	18
DNF	E	67	The Tony Roberts Team	(Australia) Tony Roberts	Ford XW Falcon GTHO Phase II	124	7
DNF	A	5	Datsun Racing Team	(Australia) John Roxburgh	Datsun 1200	100	46
DNF	A	11	AMI Racing Team	(Australia) Bill Evans (Australia) Gary Cooke	Toyota Corolla	98	49
DNF	C	27	Les Grose Racing Division	(Australia) Les Grose (Australia) Keith Grose	Holden LC Torana GTR XU-1	81	27
DNF	B	19	G Moore	(Australia) Graham Moore (Australia) Bill Brown	Holden LC Torana 2600S	52	42
DNF	E	56	Stillwell & Co Pty Ltd	(Australia) Graham Ritter (Australia) Richard Knight	Ford XW Falcon GTHO Phase II	49	8
DNF	D	50	N Beechey	(Australia) Norm Beechey (Australia) Bruce Hindhaugh	Chrysler VG Valiant Pacer 4 Barrel	39	17
DNF	C	29	Pat Cullen's Garage	(Australia) John Keran (Australia) Clyde Hodgins	Holden LC Torana GTR XU-1	38	23
DNF	E	62	Ford Motor Co of Australia	(Australia) Fred Gibson (Australia) Barry Seton	Ford XW Falcon GTHO Phase II	33	3
DNF	B	24	W.H. Motors Pty Ltd	(Australia) Bruce Stewart (Australia) Iain Corness	Datsun 1600	32	41
DNF	E	61	Byrt Ford Pty Ltd	(Australia) Garry Rush (Australia) Martin Chenery	Ford XW Falcon GTHO Phase II	27	12
DNF	E	55	Finnie Ford Pty Ltd	(Australia) David McKay	Ford XW Falcon GTHO Phase II	23	9
DNF	E	57	Aunger Accessories; Fairway Ford	(Australia) Kym Aunger (Australia) Johnnie Walker	Ford XW Falcon GTHO Phase II	18	28
DNF	E	59	Southern Motors Pty Ltd	(Australia) Bruce Hodgson	Ford XW Falcon GTHO Phase II	16	35
DNF	E	69	EL Hugo	(Australia) David Sheldon	Holden HT Monaro GTS 350	11	20
DNF	E	60	Wright Ford Motors Pty Ltd	(Australia) Bob Beasley (Australia) Bob Muir	Ford XW Falcon GTHO Phase II	6	10
DNF	A	3	Tynan Motors	(Australia) Geoff Leeds (Australia) Les Carne	Mazda 1300	3	44
DNS	E	70	Rollington Pty Ltd	(Australia) Murray Carter	Ford XW Falcon GTHO Phase II		
DNS	E	71	Ira L & AC Birk Pty Ltd	(Australia) Nick Petrilli (Australia) Mike Savva	Ford XW Falcon GTHO Phase II		
DNS	D	52	B Arentz	(Australia) Barry Arentz (Australia) Brian Michelmore	Ford Capri V6 GT		
DNS	C	45	Sydney Speed Shop Pty Ltd	(Australia) Scott McNaughton (Australia) Bob Inglis	Holden LC Torana GTR XU-1		
DNS	C	44	R Radford	(Australia) Rick Radford	Holden LC Torana GTR XU-1		
DNS	A	17	M Daddo	(Australia) M Daddo (Australia) P Ulbrich	Morris Mini K		
DNS	A	18	RG Lanyon	(Australia) A Barrett (Australia) R Withers	Mazda 1300		

== Statistics ==
- Pole Position - #64 Allan Moffat - 2:49.3
- Fastest Lap - #53 Goss/Skelton - 2:53
- Race time of winning car - 6:33:47
