= 1970 Rothmans 12 Hour =

Coordinates: 28°0′59″S 153°22′34″E

The 1970 Rothmans 12 Hour was an endurance motor race for Group E Series Production Touring Cars. The event was held at the Surfers Paradise International Raceway in Queensland, Australia on 4 January 1970 with the field divided into four classes determined by the retail price of the vehicle.

The race was won by Colin Bond and Tony Roberts driving a Class D Holden Monaro HT GTS350 for the Harry Firth run Holden Dealer Team. The pair, who four months earlier had won the 1969 Hardie-Ferodo 500 at Bathurst, covered 435 laps of the 3.219 km (2.000 mi) circuit for a distance of 1,400.265 km (870 mi).

== Classes ==
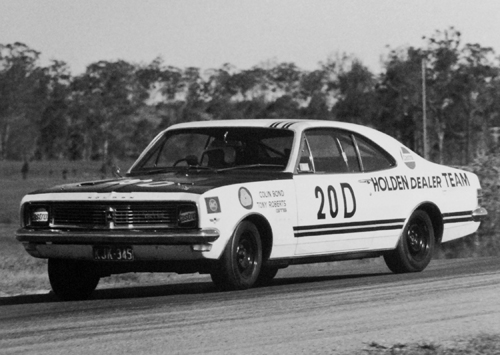
The winning Holden Monaro GTS350 (pictured at Lakeside in July 1970)

Car competed in four price classes:

- Class A: Up to 1860cc
- Class B: $1861 to $2250
- Class C: $2251 to $3100
- Class D: Over $3100

== Results ==
Position	Drivers	No.	Car	Entrant	Laps
	Class A: Up to 1860cc				
1	Wally Scott, Eric Olsen	43	Toyota Corolla	WJ Scott	398
2	Peter Lefrancke, Blair Salter		Toyota Corolla	AMI Racing Team	392
3	Lionel Cordingley, Frank Leggatt, Brian Scoffell		Morris Mini K	LW Cordingley	373
4	Barry Tapsall, Bill Evans		Datsun 1000	Datsun Racing Team	329
5	G Geshopulos, D Fraser		Hillman GT	George Geshopulos	152
DISQ	Punch, Simpson		Datsun 1000	Datsun Racing Team	
	Class B: $1861 to $2250				
1	Dave Morrow, Bob Wootton		Datsun 1600	DJ Morrow	413
2	Frank Coad, Jon Leighton		Datsun 1600	Datsun Racing Team	408
3	John Roxburgh, Graham Cosworth	31	Datsun 1600	Datsun Racing Team	402
4	Bill Beverley, Tony Basile		Mazda 1200 Coupe	Bill Beverley Motors	384
5	B Jemison, D Booty		Datsun 1600	Windmill Star Service Station	382
	Class C: $2251 to $3100				
1	Don Holland, Bob Skelton		Morris Cooper S	Miniland	426
2	Joe Camilleri, John Humphrey		Morris Cooper S	Grand Prix Auto Service	422
3	Trevor Meehan, T Strickland		Morris Cooper S	Trevor Meehan	418
4	Ron Kearns, Bob Forbes		Fiat 125	Zanardo & Rodriguez Sales and Service	415
5	Terry Friar, Bill Lubke		Mazda R100	Terry Friar	389
6	Mick McGregor, Bob Gibson		Morris Cooper S	Keith Beaney	380
7	Roy Rogers, B O'Brien, F Hunt		Mazda R100	Roy Rogers	371
?	George Giesberts, C Wenzel	19	Holden Torana LC GTR		
?	Jenny Parker, Rod Arthur		Morris Cooper S		
DNF	Cronan, Cortese		Holden Kingswood V8		
	Class D: Over $3100				
1	Colin Bond, Tony Roberts	5	Holden Monaro GTS 350	Holden Dealer Team	435
2	Bill Gates, Jim Bertram	1	Ford Falcon GTHO	McCluskey Ford Pty Ltd	434
3	Barry Arentz, Brian Michelmore	4	Ford Falcon GTHO	Central Auto Sales and Service	429
4	Paul Zacka, Graham Perry	6	Holden Monaro GTS 350	New Formula Motors	409
5	Pat Peck, Doug Macarthur	3	Ford Falcon GTHO	D & P Traders Pty Ltd	405
6	Keith Williams, Max Volkers	7	Holden Monaro GTS 350	Lockhart Motors	403
7	Glynn Scott, Roy Griffiths	2	Ford Falcon GTHO	McCluskey Ford Pty Ltd	398
DISQ	Bill Tuckey, Sib Petralia	8	Holden Monaro GTS 350	Boyded	
