= Bruce Stewart (racing driver) =

Australian racing driver (born 1939)

- Nationality: Australian
- Born: 27 December 1939 (age 86) Sydney, New South Wales

Bruce Stewart (born 27 December 1939) is an Australian former racing driver. He is best known for having the fifth most starts of any driver at the Bathurst 1000, however has often been overlooked as most starts occurred in the 'co-driver' role.

== Results ==
=== Bathurst 1000 results ===
Year	Class	Team	Car	Co-driver	Overall	Laps	Class
1965	C	Don Smith	Holden HD X2	(Australia) Don Smith	22nd	116	9th
1969	B	W.H. Motors	Datsun 1600	(Australia) George Garth	18th	117	1st
1970	B	W.H. Motors	Datsun 1600	(Australia) Iain Corness	DNF	32	DNF
1971	B	W.H. Motors	Datsun 1600		36th	109	1st
1972	A	W.H. Motors	Datsun 1200		30th	105	6th
1973	C	McLeod Kelso Lee	Holden Torana LC GTR	(Australia) George Garth	DNF	75	DNF
1974	C	W.H. Motors	Datsun 180B SSS	(Australia) George Garth	DNF	143	DNF
1975	A	Datsun Racing Team	Datsun 1200	(Australia) Bill Evans	15th	139	2nd
1976	A	John Roxburgh Motors	Datsun 1200	(Australia) Bill Evans	24th	139	1st
1977	B	James Mason Motors	Mazda RX-3	(Australia) Lynn Brown	22nd	129	6th
1978	B	ATP Australia	Ford Capri Mk.1	(Australia) Alan Cant	DNF	91	DNF
1980	B	Masterton Homes	Ford Capri Mk.2	(Australia) Cam Worner	32nd	120	6th
1981	B	Masterton Homes	Ford Capri Mk.2	(Australia) Steve Masterton	11th	111	4th
1982	A	Masterton Homes	Ford Falcon XE	(Australia) Steve Masterton	7th	155	7th
1983	A	Masterton Homes	Ford Falcon XE	(Australia) Steve Masterton	DNF	17	DNF
1984	C	Masterton Homes	Ford Falcon XE	(Australia) Steve Masterton	DNF	16	DNF
1985	C	Masterton Homes	Holden Commodore VK	(Australia) Steve Masterton	NC	96	NC
1986	A	Gibson Motorsport	Nissan Gazelle	(Australia) John Giddings	21st	146	2nd
1987	1	Miedecke Motorsport	Ford Sierra RS500	(Australia) John Giddings	13th	150	8th
1988	1	Colin Bond Racing	Ford Sierra RS500	(Australia) John Giddings	5th	155	4th
1989	1	Colin Bond Racing	Ford Sierra RS500	(Australia) Colin Bond	26th	131	21st
1990	1	Pro-Duct Motorsport	Holden Commodore VL	(Australia) Bob Pearson	15th	147	13th
1991	1	Pro-Duct Motorsport	Holden Commodore VN	(Australia) Bob Pearson	DNF	48	DNF
1993	A	Pro-Duct Motorsport	Holden Commodore VP	(Australia) Bob Pearson	13th	146	13th
1995	OC	Pro-Duct Motorsport	Holden Commodore VP	(Australia) Bob Pearson	DNF	88	DNF
