= Barry Mulholland =

Australian racing driver

Barry Mulholland (14 June 1940 – 28 April 2006) was an Australian racing driver.

Mulholland was Bruce McPhee's 'contractual obligation' co-driver. In endurance production touring cars McPhee raced in during the 1960s which required two drivers, Mulholland would drive a single lap at around mid-distance before handing the car back to McPhee. Mulholland holds the record for fewest completed laps to win a Bathurst 500 when he co-drove with McPhee to win the 1968 Bathurst 500. (Current rules limit driving to 3 hours, 30 minutes of consecutive driving, and a maximum distance a driver may run, and since 1987, a driver must complete between 54 and 107 laps each, with no driver completing more than two-thirds distance, 107 laps currently, of the race.) Mulholland later owned the car that won the race in 1968, and died aged 65.

Mulholland drove just five racing laps in the Bathurst 500 between 1963 and 1968 (missing the 1967 race), but secured sixth (1964), second (1965), third (1966), first (1968) and finally second place in 1969.

== Career results ==
=== Complete Bathurst 500 results ===
Year	Team	Co-drivers	Car	Class	Laps	Pos.	Class pos.
1964	(Australia) Frank Delandro Motors	(Australia) Bruce McPhee	Ford Cortina Mk.I GT	C	126	6th	6th
1965	(Australia) Grawill Motors Pty Ltd	(Australia) Bruce McPhee	Ford Cortina Mk.I GT500	D	130	2nd	2nd
1966	(Australia) Regal Motors	(Australia) Bruce McPhee	Morris Cooper S	C	129	3rd	3rd
1968	(Australia) Wyong Motors Pty Ltd	(Australia) Bruce McPhee	Holden HK Monaro GTS327	C	129	1st	1st
1969	(Australia) Kloster Pty Ltd	(Australia) Bruce McPhee	Ford XW Falcon GTHO	D	130	2nd	2nd

== Notes ==
Sporting positions
Preceded by Harry Firth; Fred Gibson	Winner of the Bathurst 500; 1968 (with Bruce McPhee)	Succeeded by Colin Bond; Tony Roberts
