= Hillman Gazelle =

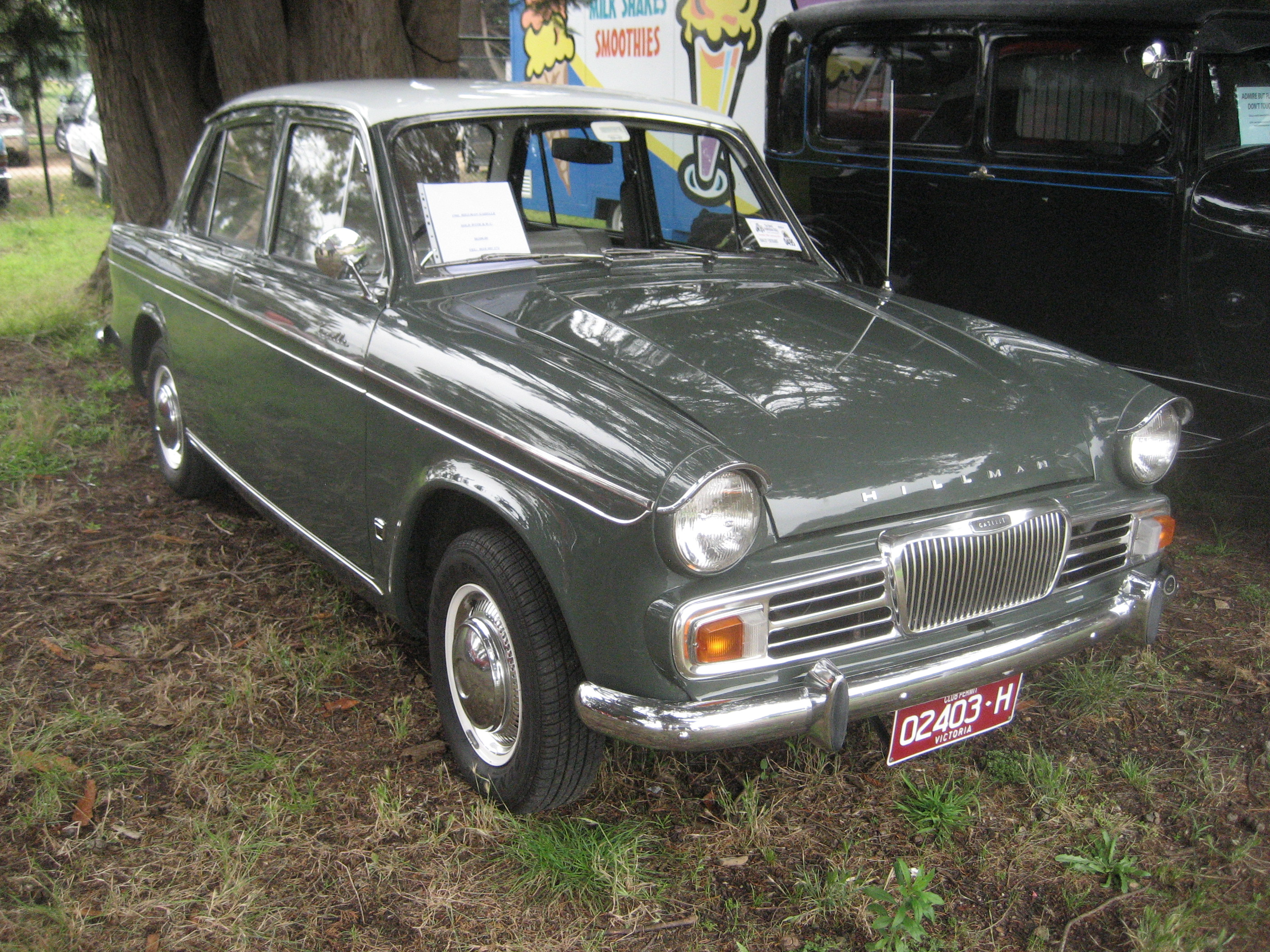
- Hillman Gazelle

Overview
- Manufacturer: Chrysler Australia
- Production: 1966–1967

Body and chassis
- Body style: 4-door saloon
- Layout: Front engine, rear-wheel-drive
- Related: Hillman Minx Series I–VI; Singer Gazelle Series I–VI; Sunbeam Rapier Series I–V

Powertrain
- Engine: 105.2 cu in (1,724 cc) overhead valve Inline-4
- Transmission: Four-speed manual; Three-speed automatic

Chronology
- Predecessor: Singer Gazelle (Australia) (1957–1961)

The Hillman Gazelle is an automobile which was produced by Chrysler Australia from 1966 to 1967.

Based on the British Singer Gazelle Series VI, the Hillman Gazelle was offered only as a four-door sedan and was essentially an upmarket version of the Hillman Minx VI. It was powered by a 105.2 cu in (1,724 cc) four-cylinder engine producing 85 bhp (63 kW; 86 PS) net, 15 bhp (11 kW; 15 PS) more than the Minx thanks to its aluminium cylinder head and twin-barreled Solex carburettor. This aluminium head engine was produced for the Sunbeam Rapier. Chrysler Australia replaced both the Minx and the Gazelle with the Hillman Arrow / Hunter range during 1967.

== See also ==
- Hillman
