= Ford Falcon (XW) =

Australian full-size car

Ford Falcon (XW) Ford Futura (XW) Ford Fairmont (XW)
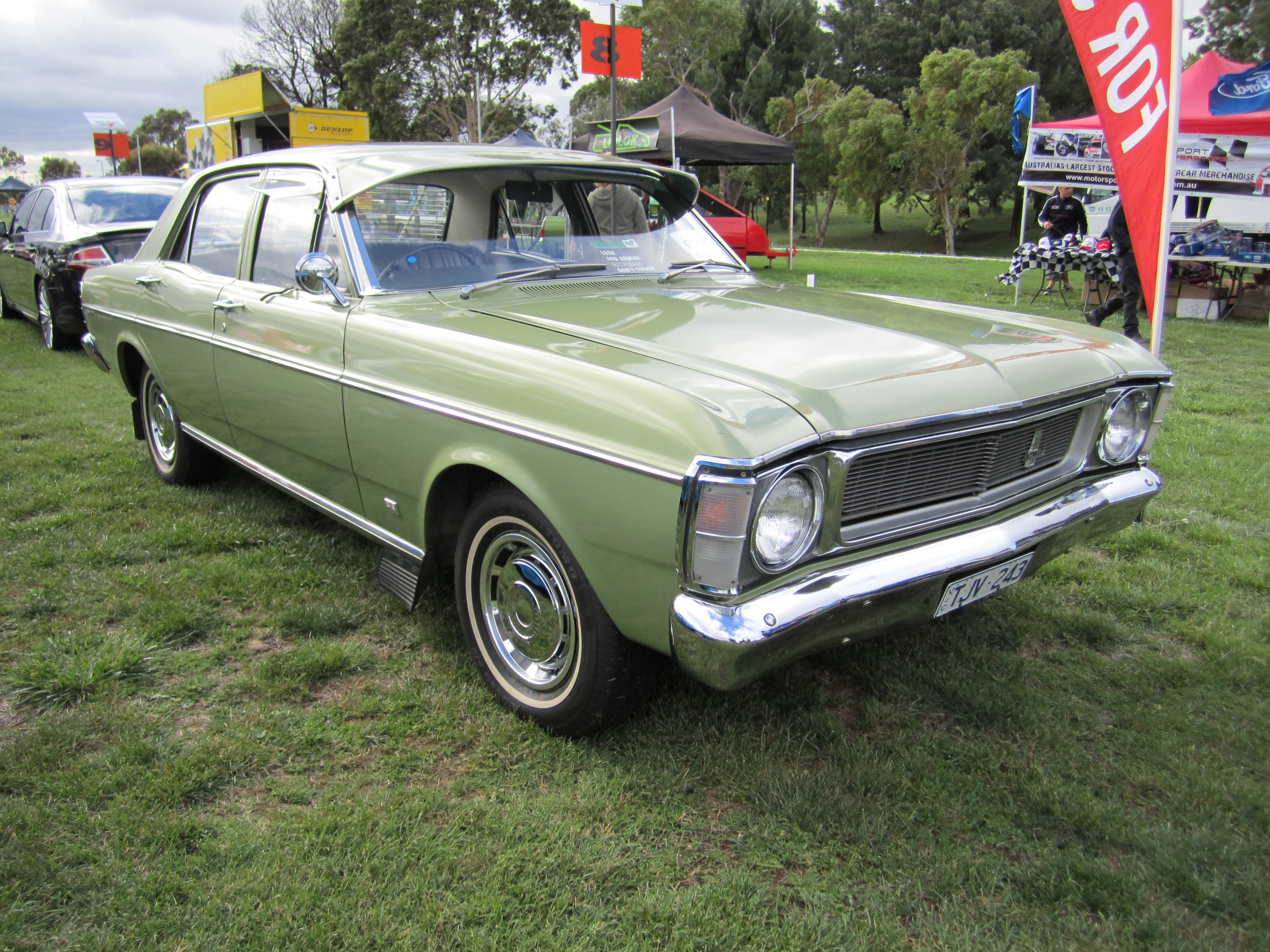
- Ford Falcon 500 Sedan (XW)

Overview
- Manufacturer: Ford Australia
- Production: June 1969 – October 1970

Body and chassis
- Class: Full-size car
- Body style: 4 door sedan 5 door station wagon 2 door coupé utility 2 door van
- Layout: FR layout

Powertrain
- Engine: 3.1 L (188 CID) 6-cyl 3.6 L (221 CID) 6-cyl 4.9 L (302 CID) "small block" V8; 5.8 L (351 CID) “Windsor" and "Cleveland" (in second series GT-HO) V8 "
- Transmission: 3spd manual 4spd manual 3spd “Fordomatic” automatic 3spd “Cruisomatic” automatic

Dimensions
- Wheelbase: 2,819 mm (111.0 in)
- Length: 4,689 mm (184.6 in)
- Width: 1,869 mm (73.6 in)
- Height: 1,417 mm (55.8 in)
- Kerb weight: 1,348 kg (2,971.8 lb)

Chronology
- Predecessor: Ford Falcon (XT)
- Successor: Ford Falcon (XY)

The Ford Falcon (XW) is a full-size car that was produced by Ford Australia from 1969 to 1970. It was the third iteration of the second generation of the Falcon and also included the Ford Futura (XW) and the Ford Fairmont (XW)—the luxury-oriented version.

== Introduction ==
The XW Falcon was released in June 1969 replacing the XT Falcon. The XW was an extensive facelift of the XT, featuring a new grille and tail lights. Almost all exterior panels were new and the interior was extensively redesigned.

== Model range ==
The XW Falcon range featured eight passenger vehicles and three commercial models.

- Ford Falcon Sedan
- Ford Falcon Wagon
- Ford Falcon 500 Sedan
- Ford Falcon 500 Wagon
- Ford Futura Sedan
- Ford Fairmont Sedan
- Ford Fairmont Wagon
- Ford Falcon GT
- Ford Falcon Utility
- Ford Falcon Van
- Ford Falcon 500 Utility

The Futura was new for the XW, reviving a name last used in the 1965 XP Falcon range. A Grand Sport rally option package was available on Falcon 500, Futura & Fairmont sedans.

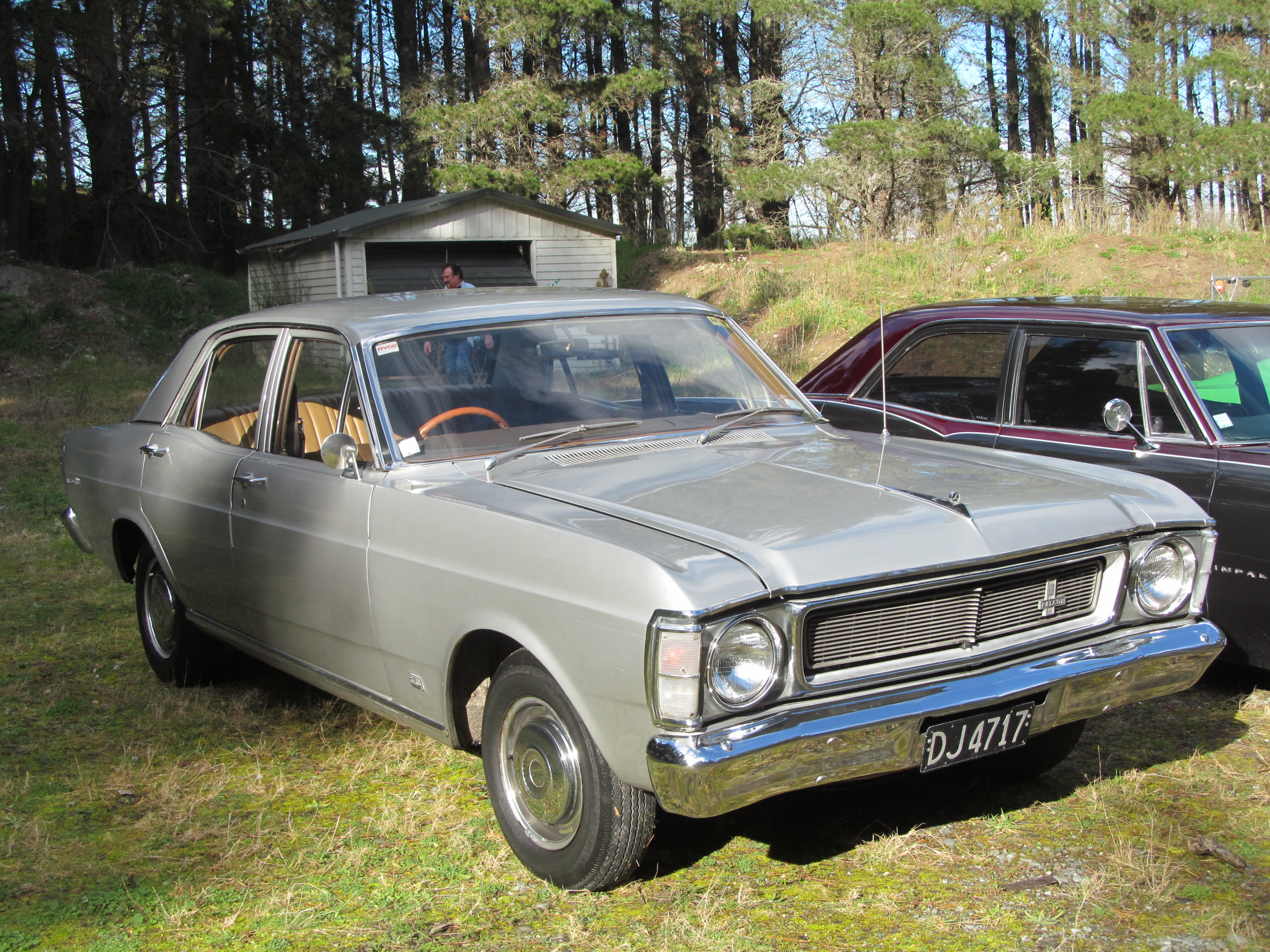
Ford XW Falcon 500 sedan

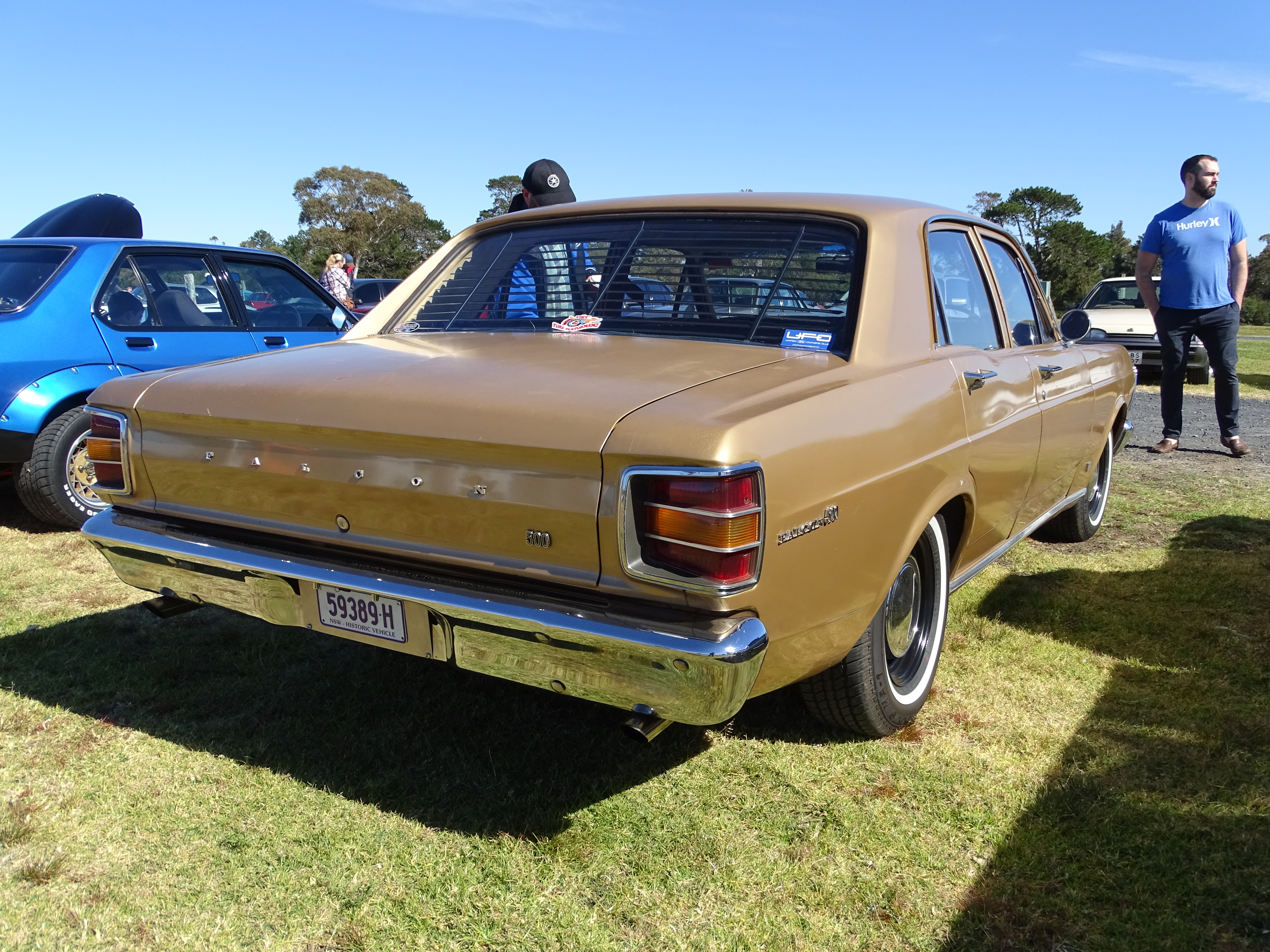
Ford XW Falcon 500 sedan

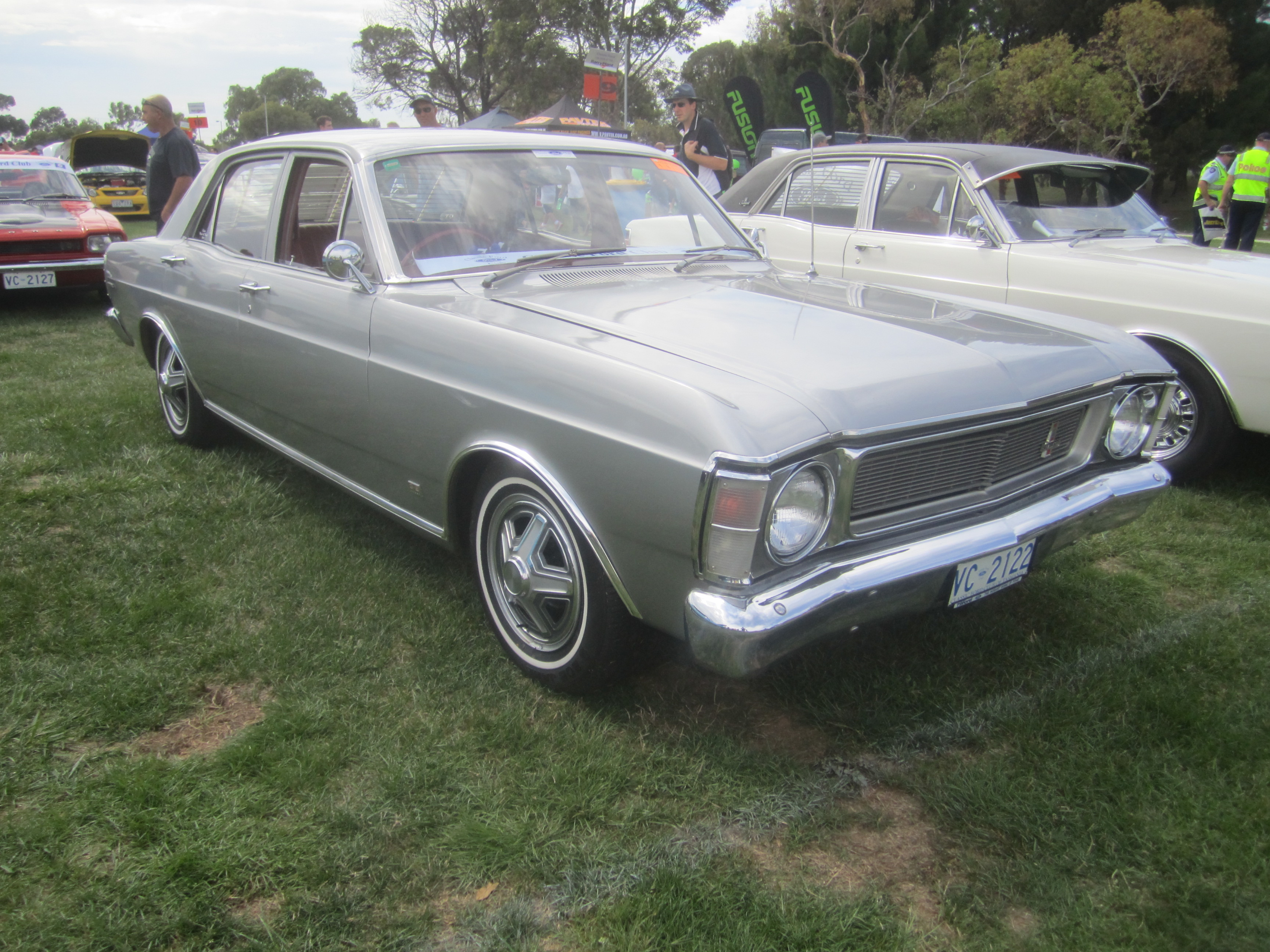
Ford XW Futura sedan

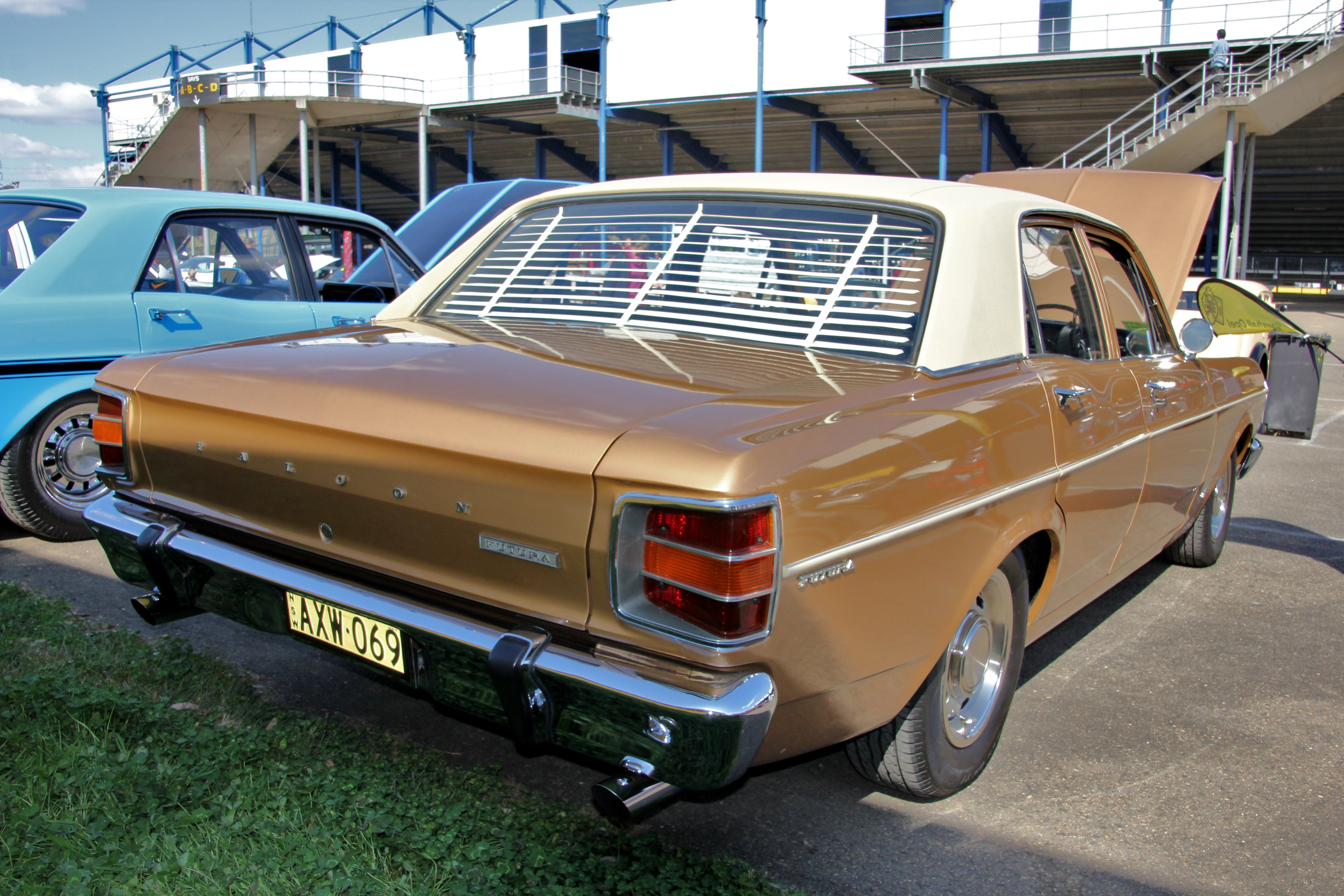
Ford XW Falcon Futura sedan

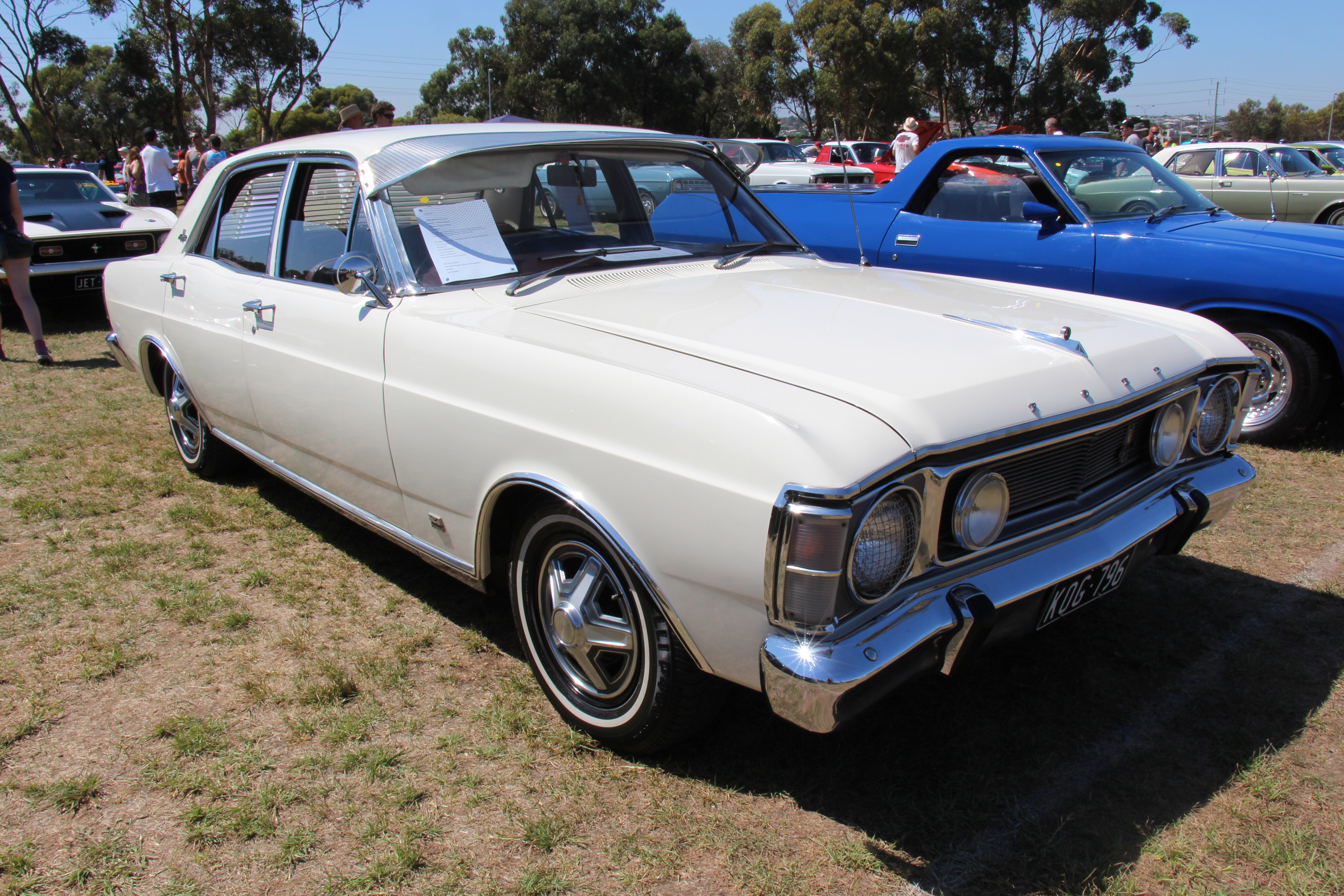
Ford XW Fairmont sedan (with non-standard driving lights)

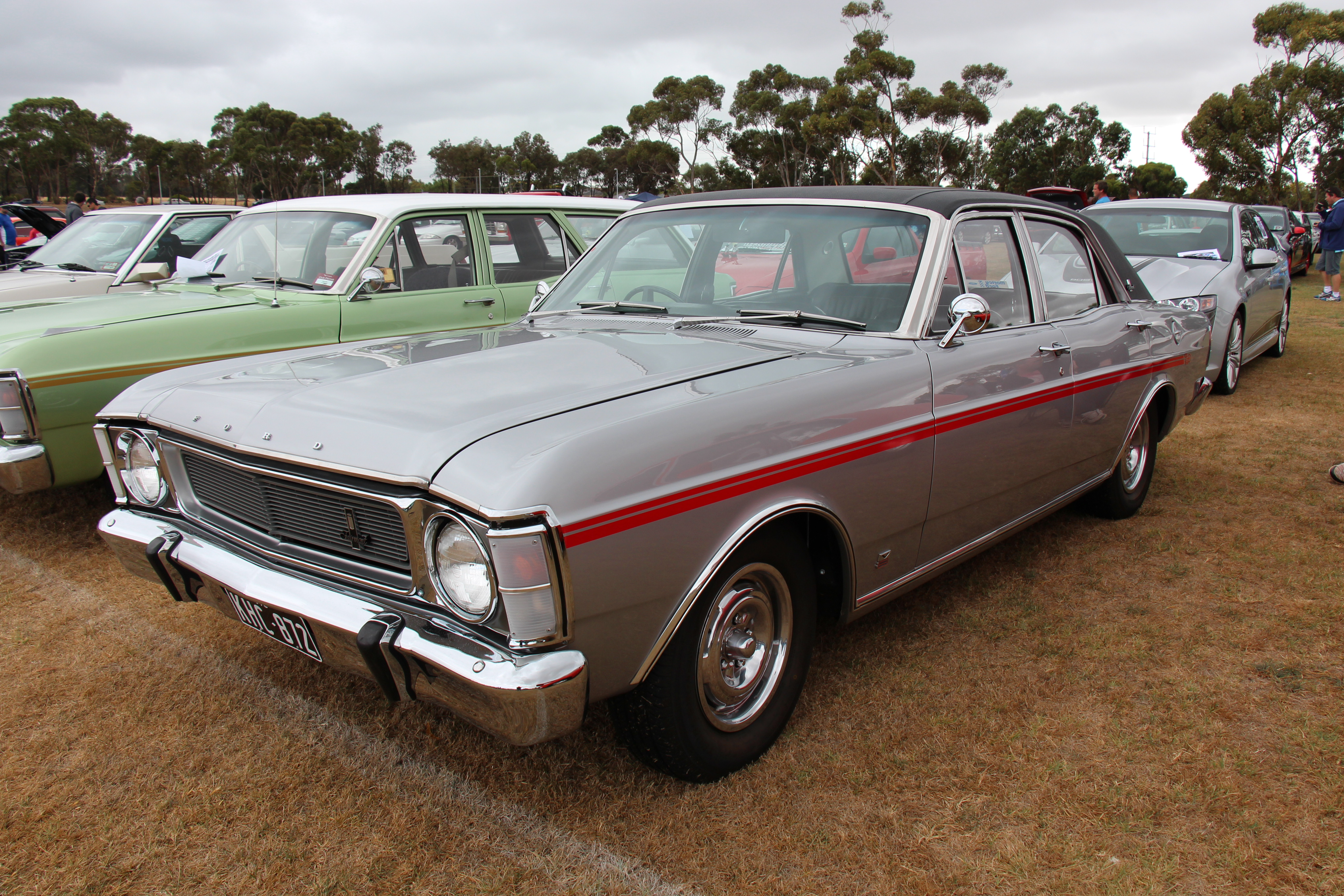
Ford XW Fairmont sedan (with Grand Sport rally option package)

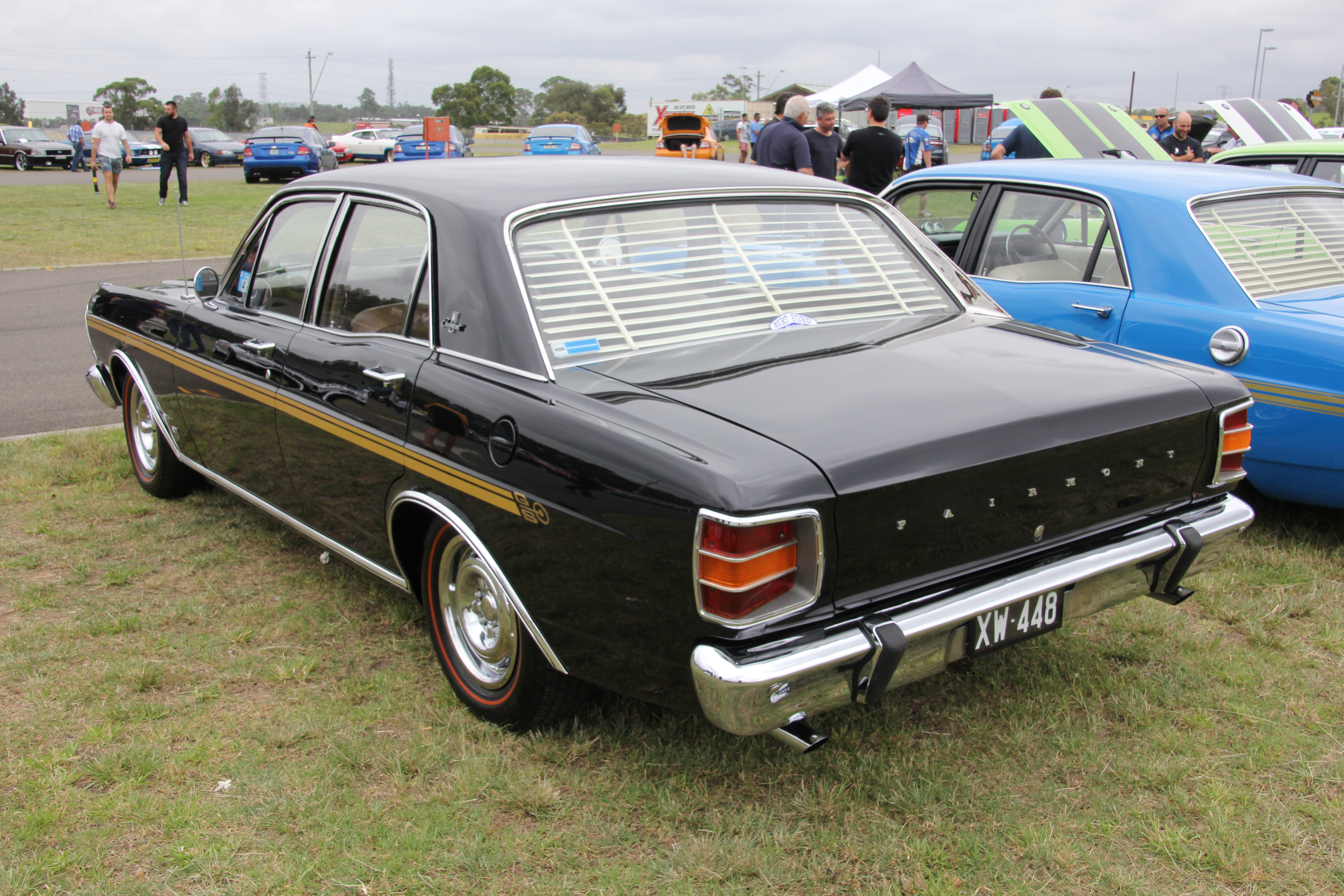
Ford XW Fairmont sedan (with Grand Sport rally option package)

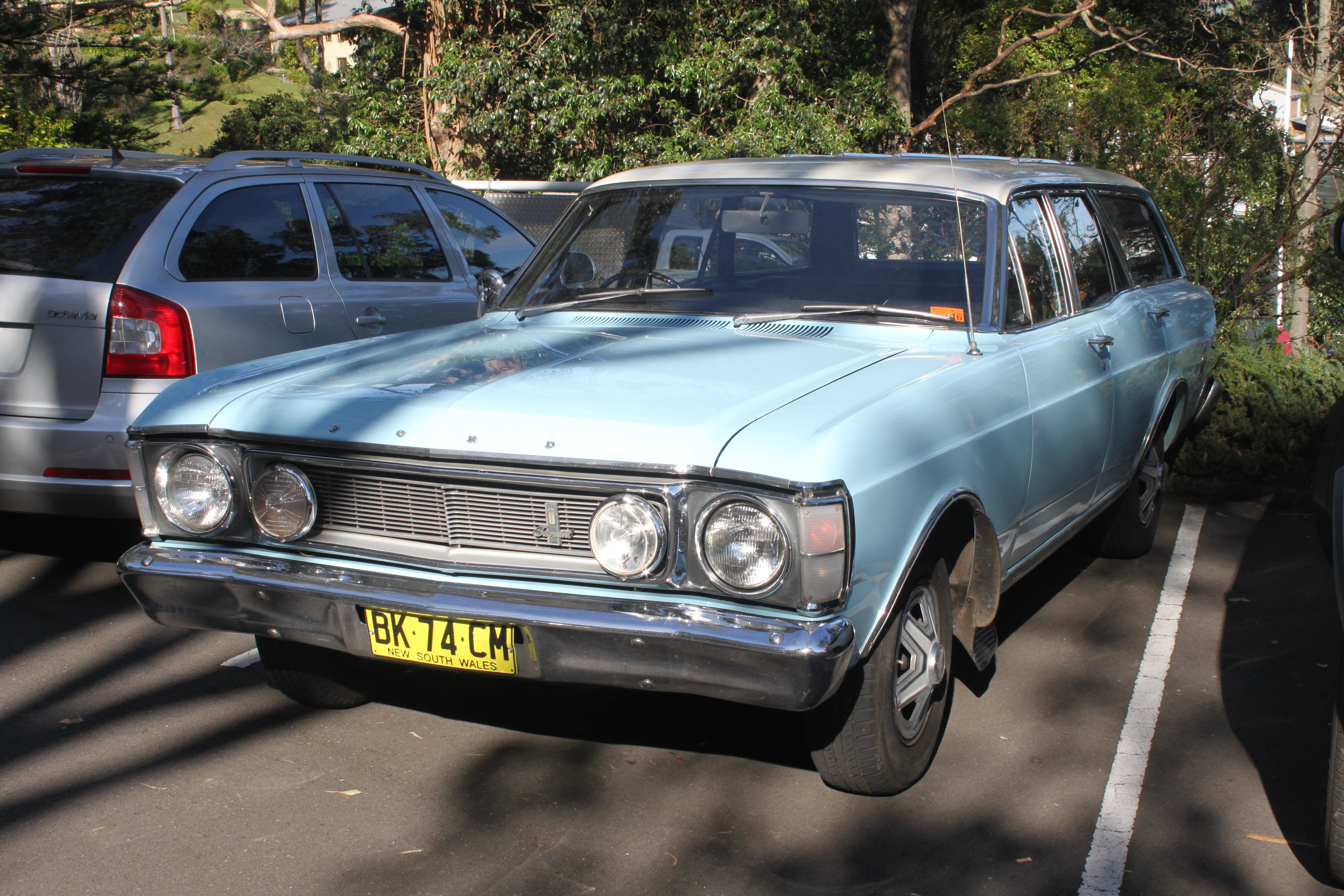
Ford XW Fairmont wagon (with non-standard driving lights)

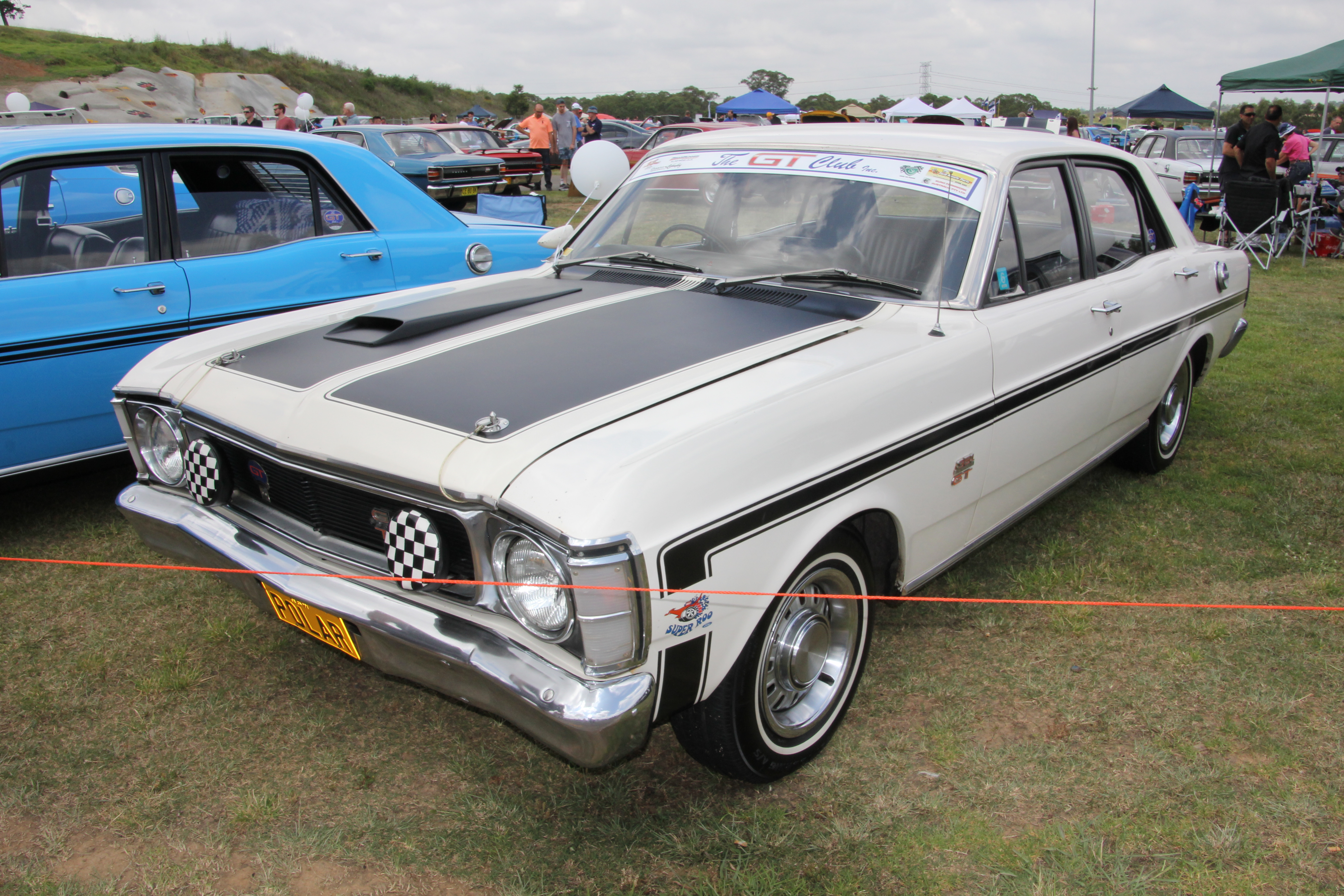
Ford XW Falcon GT sedan

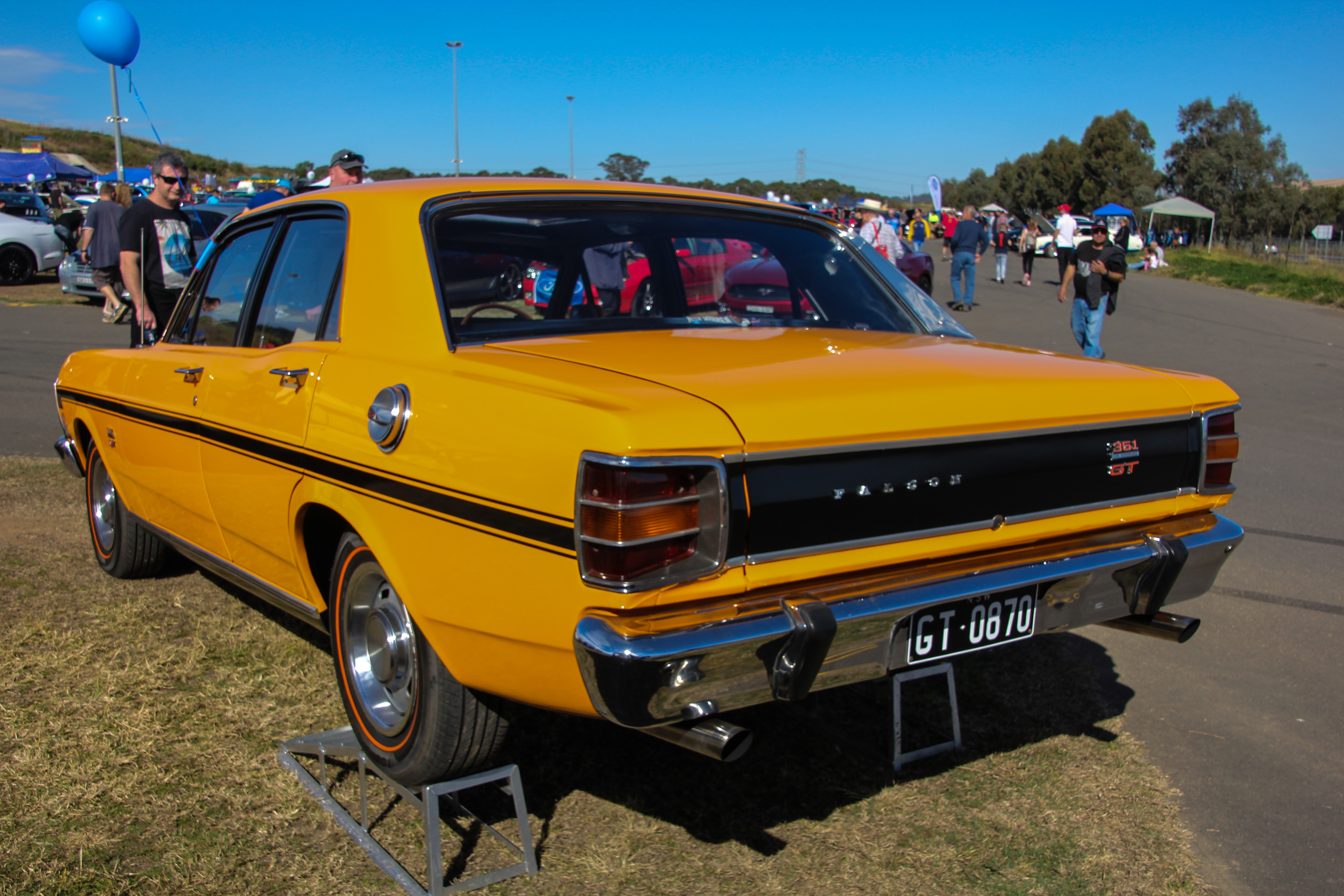
Ford XW Falcon GT sedan

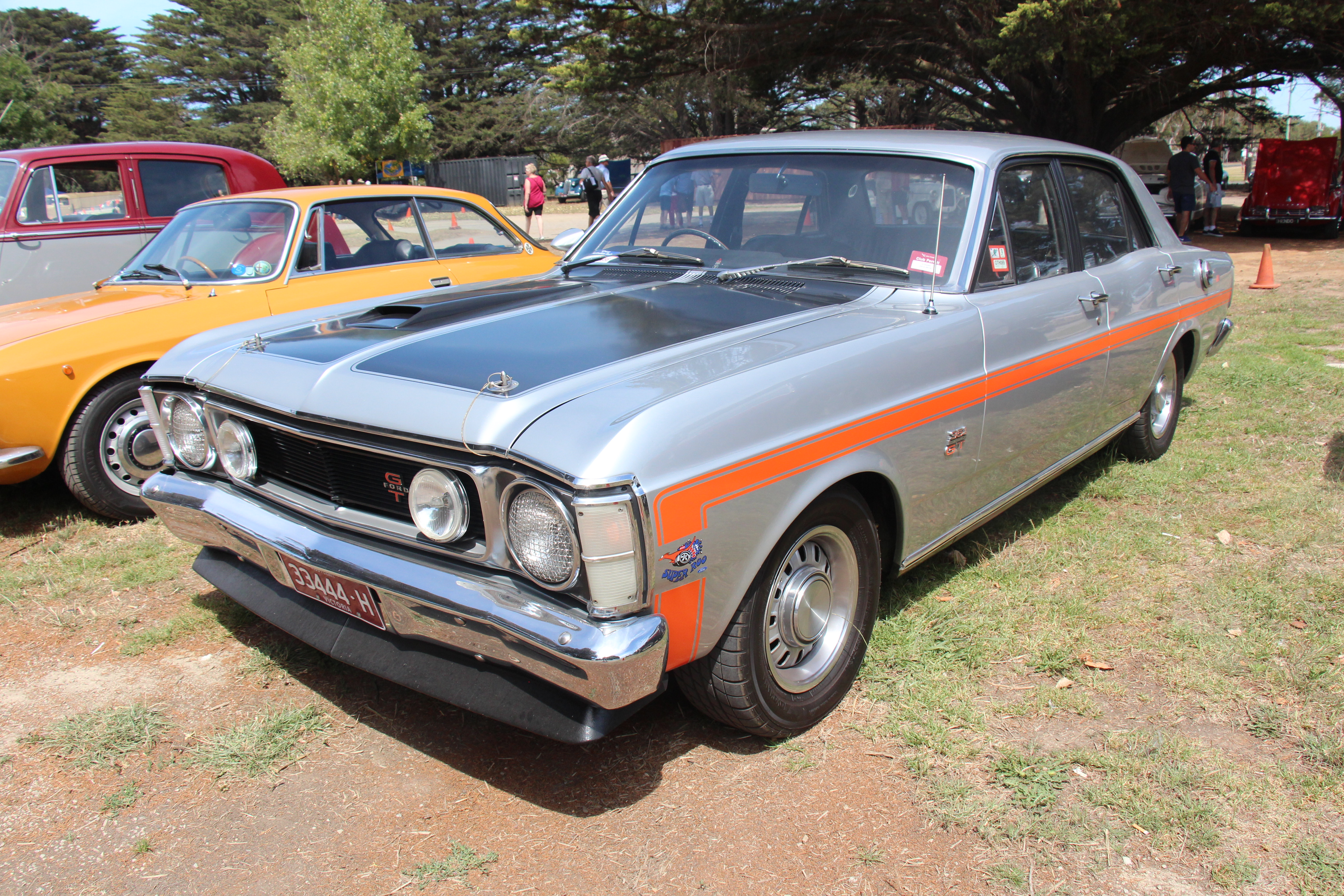
Ford XW Falcon GT-HO sedan

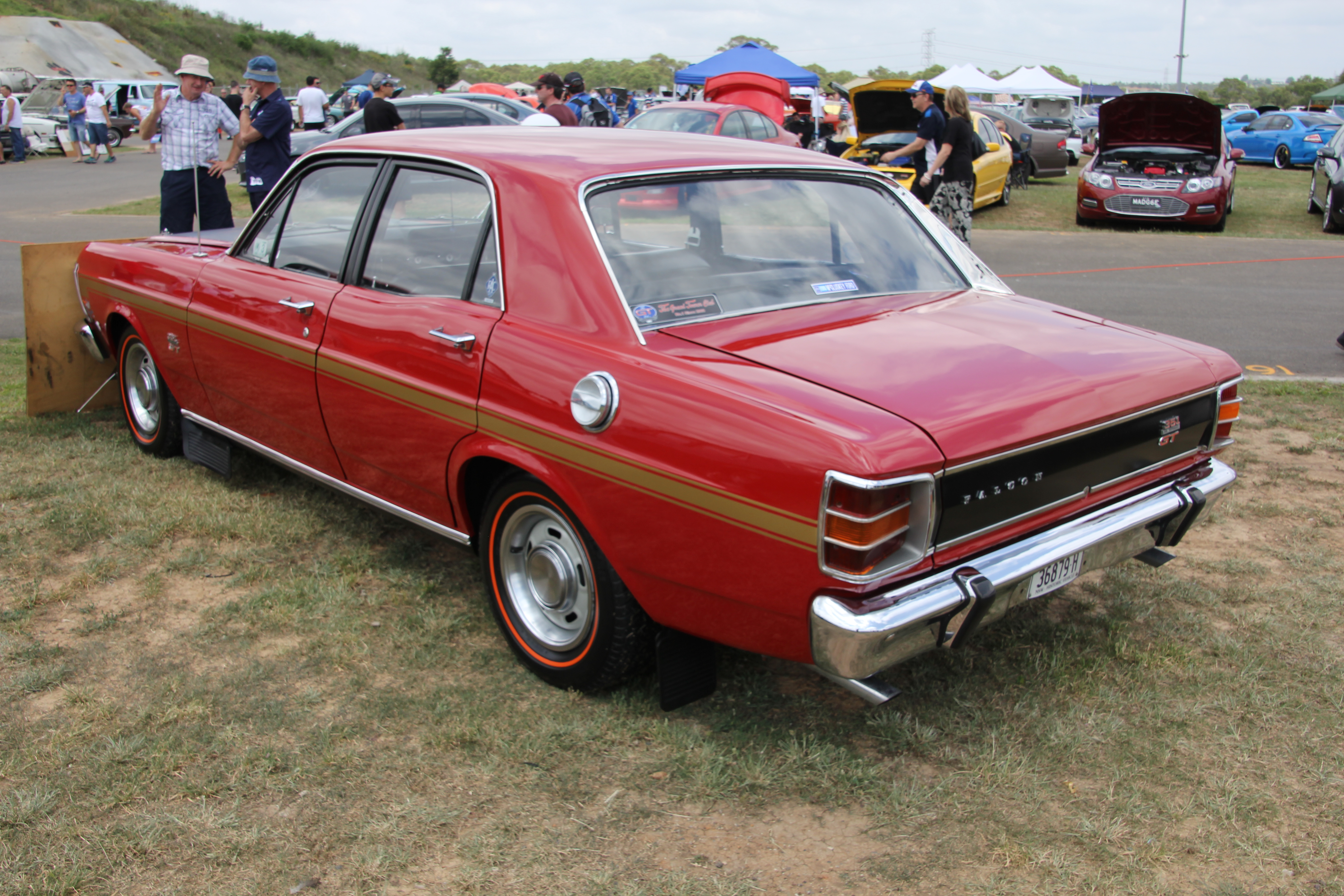
Ford XW Falcon GT-HO sedan

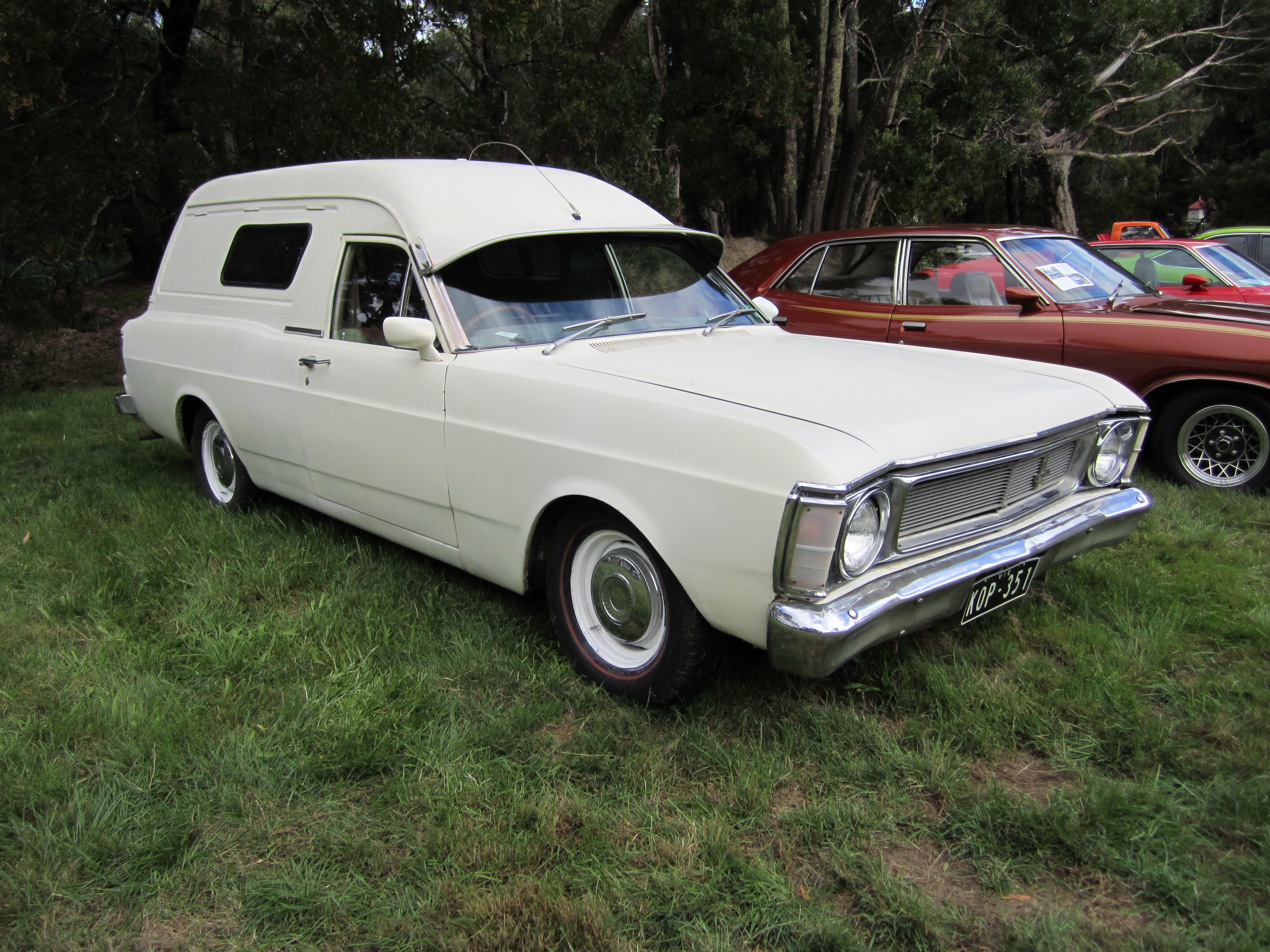
Ford XW Falcon van

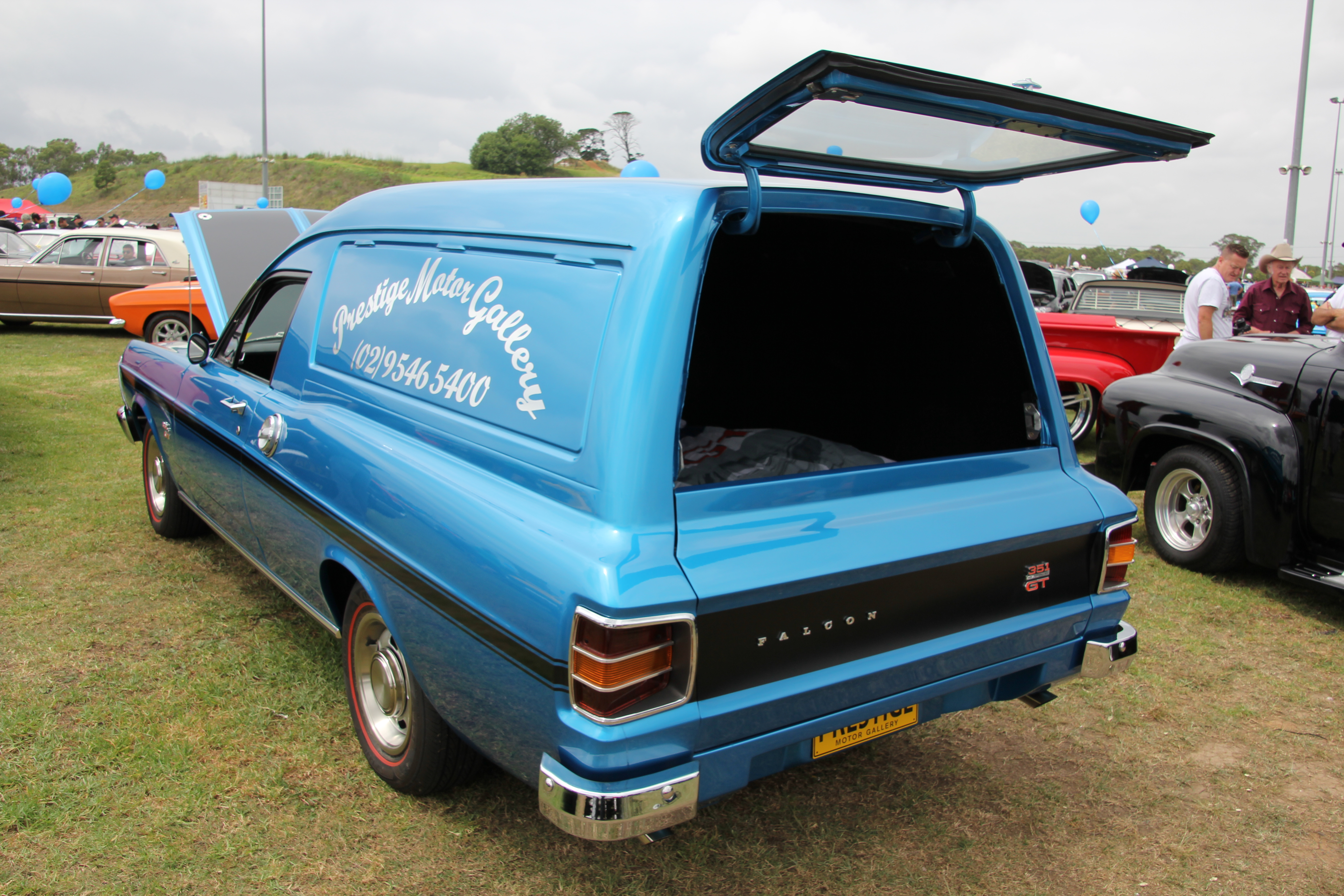
Ford XW Falcon panel van (GT tribute)

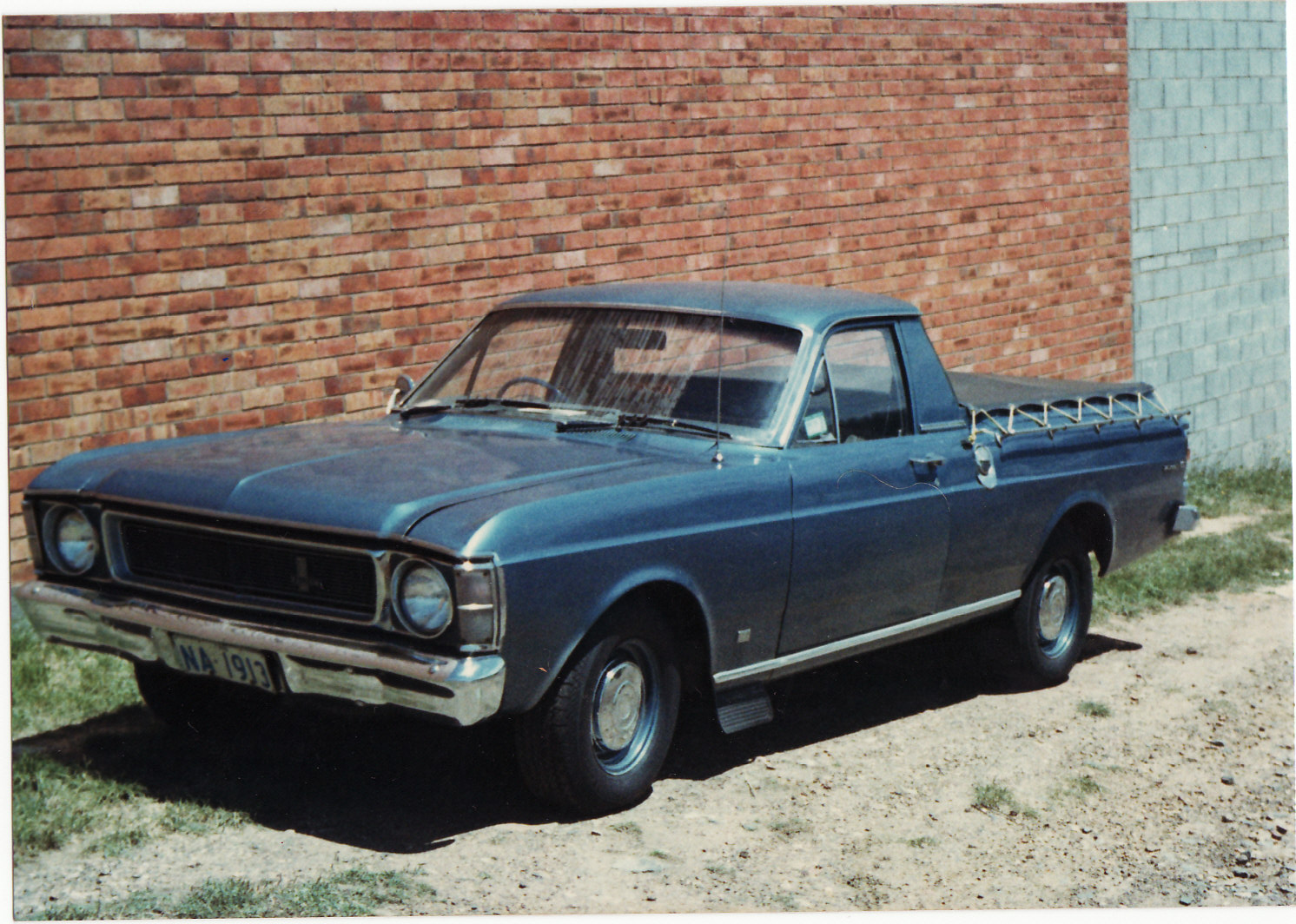
Ford XW Falcon 500 utility

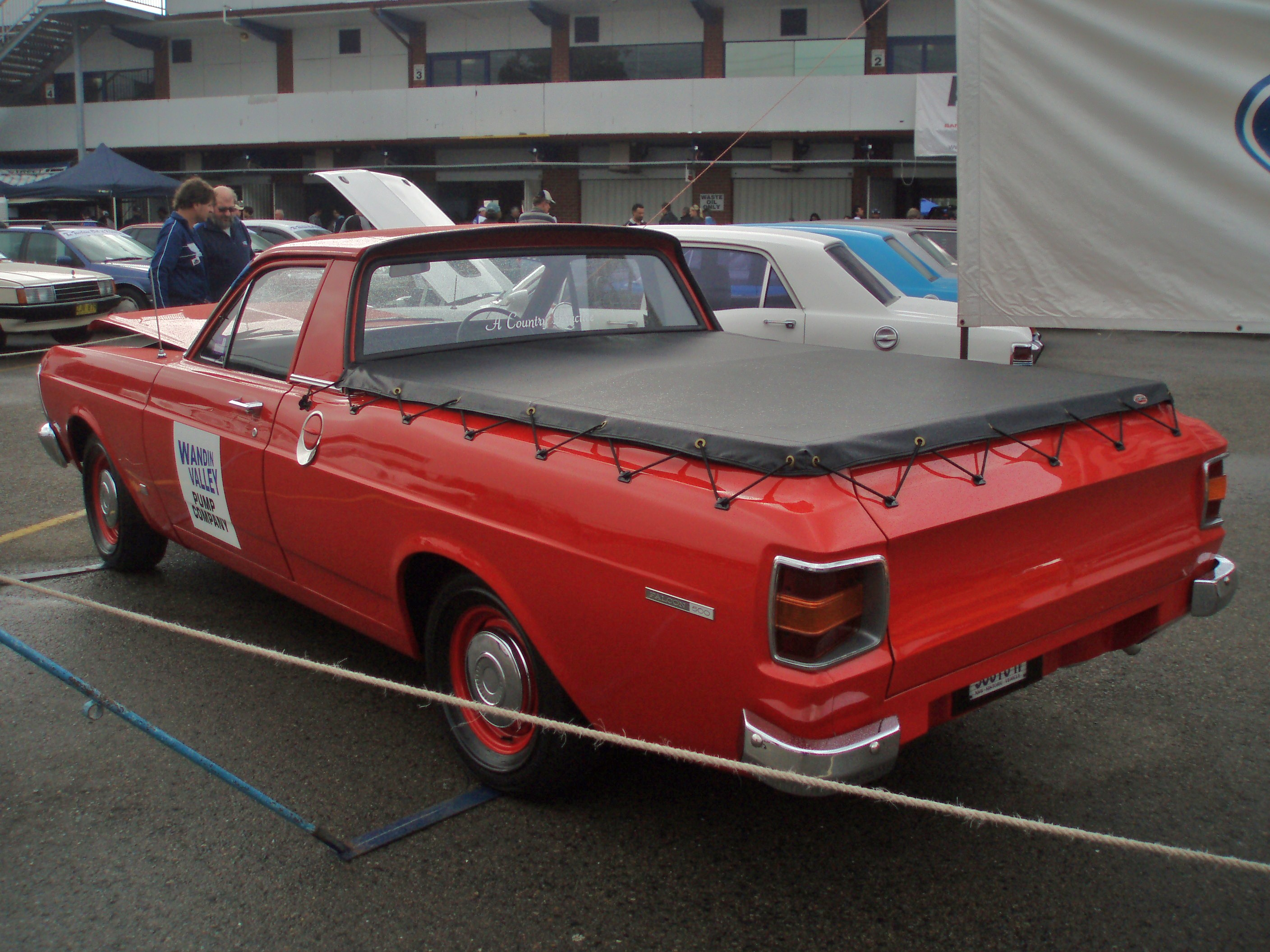
Ford XW Falcon 500 utility

== GT-HO ==
The limited production, high performance Falcon GT-HO was released two months after the mainstream models. A further development, the GT-HO Phase II was released on 24 August 1970.

== Engines ==
3.1 litre & 3.6 litre in-line six cylinder engines carried over from the XT Falcon as did the 4.9 litre V8. A 5.8 litre V8 (the 351 Windsor) was introduced initially with the XW, as was later the 351 Cleveland in the Phase 1.5 and 2 model.

== Production ==
Production of the XW Falcon range totalled 105,785 vehicles. 2,287 XW Falcon GTs and 662 XW GT-HOs were built.

== Replacement ==
The XW Falcon was replaced by the XY Falcon in October 1970.
