= List of Ford Falcon GT victories =

This list of Ford Falcon GT motorsport victories includes the Australian Touring Car Championship. From 1965 to 1972 the ATCC was open to Group C Improved Production Touring Cars and to Group C Touring Cars from 1973. From 1969 to 1972, Group E Series Production Touring Cars were also eligible to compete for the ATCC.

The Australian Manufacturers' Championship was open to Group E Series Production Touring Cars in 1971 and 1972 and then to Group C Touring Cars from 1973.

The "Bathurst 500" endurance races were open to production sedans up to and including 1971 and to Group E Series Production Touring Cars in 1972. Subsequent "Bathurst 1000" races were open to Group C Touring Cars.

== Race and rally victories ==
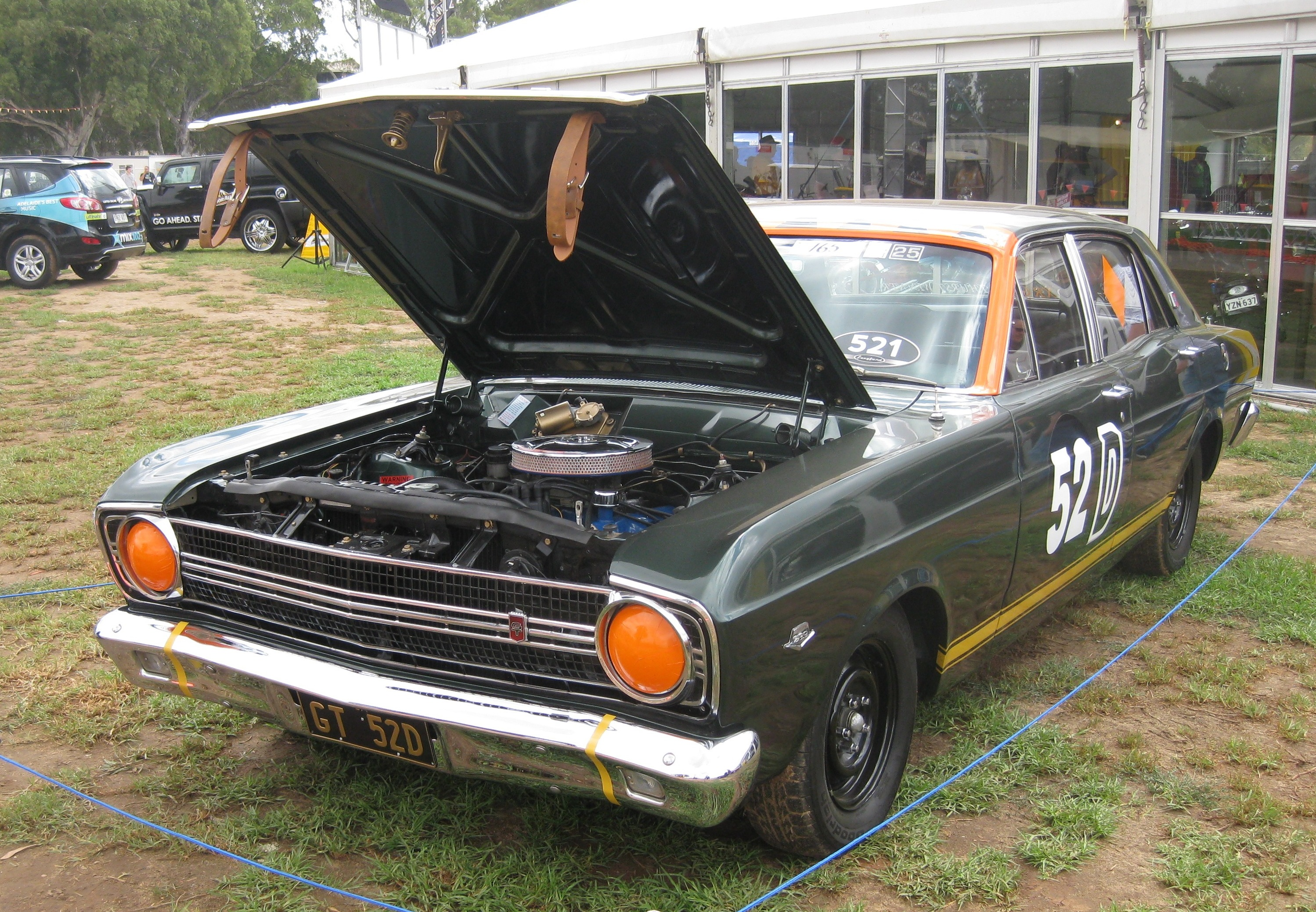
A "race replica" of the Ford XR Falcon GT driven by Harry Firth and Fred Gibson to win the 1967 Gallaher 500

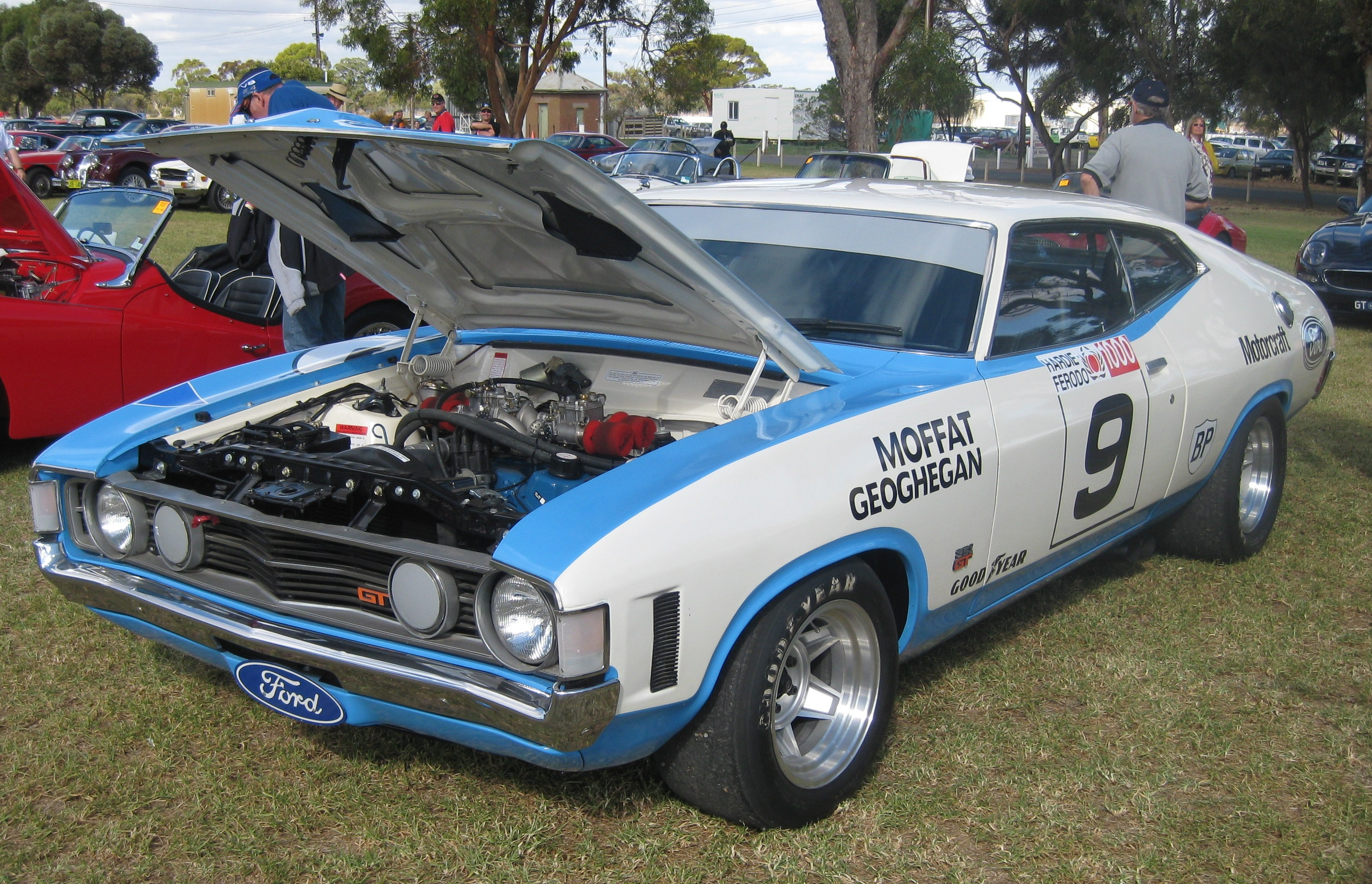
A "race replica" of the Ford XA Falcon GT Hardtop driven by Allan Moffat and Ian Geoghegan to win the 1973 Hardie-Ferodo 1000

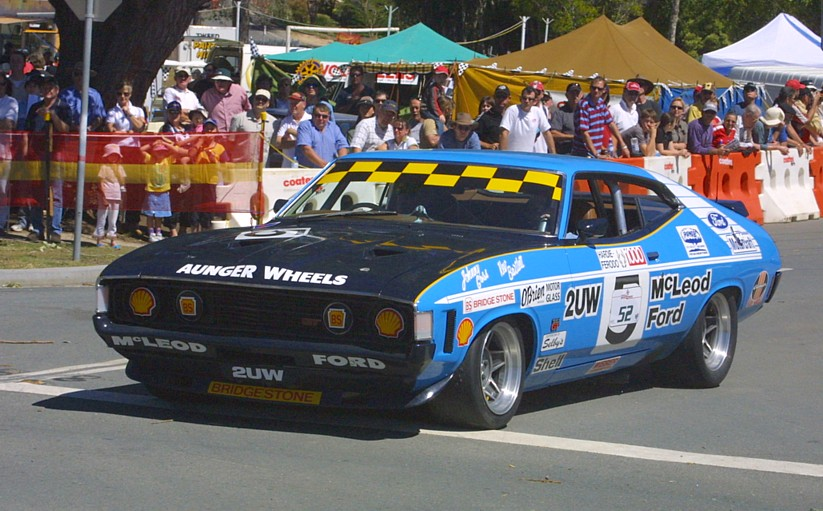
A "race replica" of the Ford XA Falcon GT Hardtop driven by John Goss and Kevin Bartlett to win the 1974 Hardie-Ferodo 1000

Year	Date	Event	Circuit	Winner	Car
1967	1 October	Gallaher 500	Mount Panorama Circuit, Bathurst	(Australia) Harry Firth (Australia) Fred Gibson	XR GT
1968	24 November - 18 December	London–Sydney Marathon	Not applicable	(Australia) Team Prize; 3rd Ian Vaughan; 6th Bruce Hodgson; 8th Harry Firth	XT GT
1969	5 January	Rothmans 12 Hour Classic	Surfers Paradise International Raceway	Bill Gates, Jim Bertram	XT GT
1969	14 September	Datsun Three Hour	Sandown Park	Allan Moffat; John French	XW GT-HO
1970	4 October	Hardie-Ferodo 500	Mount Panorama Circuit, Bathurst	(Canada) Allan Moffat	XW GT-HO Phase II
1970	1 November	Rothmans 250 Production Classic	Surfers Paradise International Raceway	(Canada) Allan Moffat	XW GT-HO Phase II
1971	12 April	Rothmans 3 Hour; AMC Round 1	Mount Panorama Circuit, Bathurst	(Canada) Allan Moffat	XW GT-HO Phase II
1971	4 October	Hardie-Ferodo 500	Mount Panorama Circuit, Bathurst	(Canada) Allan Moffat	XY GT-HO Phase III
1971	7 November	Rothmans 250; AMC Round 5	Surfers Paradise International Raceway	(Canada) Allan Moffat	XY GT-HO Phase III
1972
1972	3 April	ATCC Round 3	Mount Panorama Circuit, Bathurst	(Australia) Ian Geoghegan	XY GT-HO Phase III
1972	10 September	Sandown 250; AMC Round 2	Sandown Park	(Australia) John Goss	XY GT-HO Phase III
1972	21 October	Phillip Island 500K; AMC Round 4	Phillip Island	(Canada) Allan Moffat	XY GT-HO Phase III
1972	26 November	Chesterfield 300 AMC Round 5	Surfers Paradise International Raceway	(Canada) Allan Moffat	XY GT-HO Phase III
1973	5 March	ATCC Round 1	Symmons Plains Raceway	(Canada) Allan Moffat	XY GT-HO Phase III
1973	18 March	ATCC Round 2	Calder Raceway	(Canada) Allan Moffat	XY GT-HO Phase III
1973	15 April	ATCC Round 3	Sandown Park	(Canada) Allan Moffat	XY GT-HO Phase III
1973	6 May	ATCC Round 4	Wanneroo Park	(Canada) Allan Moffat	XY GT-HO Phase III
1973	24 June	ATCC Round 7	Oran Park Raceway	(Canada) Allan Moffat	XY GT-HO Phase III
1973	26 August	Chesterfield 250; AMC Round 1	Adelaide International Raceway	(Australia) Fred Gibson	XA GT Hardtop
1973	30 September	Hardie-Ferodo 1000; AMC Round 3	Mount Panorama Circuit, Bathurst	(Canada) Allan Moffat (Australia) Ian Geoghegan	XA GT Hardtop
1974	7 April	ATCC Round 3	Sandown Park	(Canada) Allan Moffat	XB GT Hardtop
1974	28 April	ATCC Round 5	Oran Park Raceway	(Canada) Allan Moffat	XB GT Hardtop
1974	8 September	Sandown 250; AMC Round 2	Sandown Park	(Canada) Allan Moffat	XB GT Hardtop
1974	6 October	Hardie-Ferodo 1000; AMC Round 3	Mount Panorama Circuit, Bathurst	(Australia) John Goss (Australia) Kevin Bartlett	XA GT Hardtop
1975	8 September	Rothmans 300; AMC Round 4	Surfers Paradise International Raceway	(Canada) Allan Moffat	XB GT Hardtop
1976	17 March	ATCC Round 2	Calder Raceway	(Canada) Allan Moffat	XB GT Hardtop
1976	28 March	ATCC Round 3	Oran Park Raceway	(Canada) Allan Moffat	XB GT Hardtop
1976	6 June	ATCC Round 6	Adelaide International Raceway	(Canada) Allan Moffat	XB GT Hardtop
1977	7 March	ATCC Round 1	Symmons Plains Raceway	(Canada) Allan Moffat	XB GT Hardtop
1977	20 March	ATCC Round 2	Calder Raceway	(Canada) Allan Moffat	XB GT Hardtop
1977	27 March	ATCC Round 3	Oran Park Raceway	(Canada) Allan Moffat	XB GT Hardtop
1977	10 April	ATCC Round 4	Amaroo Park	(Canada) Allan Moffat	XB GT Hardtop
1977	17 April	ATCC Round 5	Sandown Park	(Canada) Allan Moffat	XB GT Hardtop
1977	5 June	ATCC Round 6	Adelaide International Raceway	(Canada) Allan Moffat	XB GT Hardtop

== Championship and series victories ==
Year	Championship / series	Winner	Car
1970	Tasman Touring Series	Allan Moffat; Ford Motor Company of Australia	XW GT-HO Phase I
1970	Grace Brothers - Toby Lee Series	Fred Gibson	XW GT-HO Phase I
1971	Grace Brothers - Toby Lee Series	Fred Gibson	XW GT-HO Phase II
1972	Australian Manufacturers' Championship	Ford Australia	XY GT-HO Phase III
1972	South Pacific Touring Series	John Goss; McLeod Ford	XY GT-HO Phase III
1973	Australian Touring Car Championship	Allan Moffat	XY GT-HO Phase III
1976	Australian Touring Car Championship	Allan Moffat	XB GT Hardtop
1977	Australian Touring Car Championship	Allan Moffat	XB GT Hardtop (Note 1)

Note 1: Moffat drove a Ford XC Falcon GS 500 Hardtop in Rounds 8, 9 and 10 of the 1977 Australian Touring Car Championship
