= 1971 Phillip Island 500K =

The 1971 Phillip Island 500K was an endurance race for Group E Series Production Touring Cars held at the Phillip Island Grand Prix Circuit in Victoria, Australia on 24 October 1971. The event was staged over a race distance of 106 laps, totalling 318 mi (512 km). It was Round 4 of the 1971 Australian Manufacturers' Championship.

The race was won by Colin Bond, driving a Holden Torana GTR XU-1.

== Classes ==
The field was divided into five classes according to the assessed CP Units of each car (i.e. engine capacity in litres multiplied by retail price in dollars).

== Results ==
Position	Drivers	No.	Car	Entrant	Laps
1	Colin Bond	31	Holden Torana GTR XU-1	Holden Dealer Team	106
2	Peter Brock	32	Holden Torana GTR XU-1	Holden Dealer Team	106
3	Doug Chivas	45	Chrysler Valiant Charger	Liverpool Chrysler	105
4	Frank Porter	43	Holden Torana GTR XU-1	Garry & Warren Smith	104
5	Allan Moffat	65	Ford Falcon XY GTHO Phase III	Ford Motor Co. of Australia Ltd.	104
6	Tony Roberts	39	Holden Torana GTR XU-1	Dustings of Burwood	102
7	Tom Naughton	33	Chrysler Valiant Charger	Northcote Chrysler	101
8	John Piper	29	Ford Escort Mk.I Twin Cam	J. J. Piper	99
9	Bill Evans	27	Ford Escort Mk.I Twin Cam	R. G. Wilson	99
10	Bob Forbes	23	Fiat 124S	Fiat Dealer Team	98
	Class A (Up to 3000 CP Units)				
1	Geoff Perry	3	Mazda 1300	G. R. Perry	90
2	Mel Mollison	4	Mazda 1300	M. N. Mollison	87
3	Jim Laing-Peach	2	Datsun 1200	Datsun Racing Team	85
DNF	Doug Whiteford	1	Datsun 1200	Datsun Racing Team	?
	Class B (3001 to 4600 CP Units)				
1	Bill Stanley, Paul Gulson	10	Morris Cooper S	Marque Motors	96
2	Lakis Manticas	19	Morris Cooper S	British Leyland Works	92
3	Ron McCormack	14	Honda 1300	Melbourne Vehicles Sales	
	Class C (2601 to 9000 CP Units)				
1	John Piper	29	Ford Escort Mk.I Twin Cam	J. J. Piper	99
2	Bill Evans	27	Ford Escort Mk.I Twin Cam	R. G. Wilson	99
3	Bob Forbes	23	Fiat 124S	Fiat Dealer Team	98
4	Clive Millis	24	Mazda Capella RE	Clive Millis Motors Pty. Ltd.	97
DNF	Tony Niovanni	22	Mazda Capella RE		
DNF	Jim Murcott	25	Ford Escort Mk.I Twin Cam	Brian Wood Ford	44
DNF	Barry Ward	26	Ford Escort Mk.I Twin Cam	B. Ward	
DNF	Alan Keith	28	Ford Escort Mk.I Twin Cam	A. Keith	2
	Class D (9001 to 18000 CP Units)				
1	Colin Bond	31	Holden Torana GTR XU-1	Holden Dealer Team	106
2	Peter Brock	32	Holden Torana GTR XU-1	Holden Dealer Team	106
3	Doug Chivas	45	Chrysler Valiant Charger	Liverpool Chrysler	105
4	Frank Porter	43	Holden Torana GTR XU-1	Garry & Warren Smith	104
5	Tony Roberts	39	Holden Torana GTR XU-1	Dustings of Burwood	102
6	Tom Naughton	33	Chrysler Valiant Charger	Northcote Chrysler	101
7	Malcolm Ramsay	41	Holden Torana GTR XU-1	City State Racing Team	97
	Lawrie Nelson	34	Chrysler Valiant Charger	Northcote Chrysler	
	Mike Bertram	44	Holden Torana GTR XU-1	M. J. Bertram	
	Lionel Rose	37	Holden Torana GTR XU-1	T. Robertson	
DNF	Leo Geoghegan	46	Chrysler Valiant Charger	Geoghegan Sporty Cars	
DNF	Bruce McPhee	38	Holden Torana GTR XU-1	Kevin Dennis Motors	
DNF	Brian Reed	40	Chrysler Valiant Charger	West Heidelberg Motors	
DNF	Noel Devine	35	Chrysler Valiant Charger	Eastside Chrysler	
DNF	John Walker	42	Holden Torana GTR XU-1	City State Racing Team	
	Class E (18001 and Over CP Units)				
1	Allan Moffat	65	Ford Falcon XY GTHO Phase III	Ford Motor Co. of Australia Ltd.	104
2	Don Preece	61	Ford Falcon XY GTHO Phase III	Pitstop Motors	84
DNF	Murray Carter	60	Ford Falcon XY GTHO Phase III	John Harding Ford	
DNF	Phil Barnes	62	Ford Falcon XY GTHO Phase III	Byrt Ford	

Note: The above table may not show all starters.
