= 1971 Sandown 250 =

The 1971 Sandown 250 was an endurance motor race open to Group E Series Production Touring Cars. The event was held at the Sandown circuit in Victoria, Australia on 12 September 1971 over 130 laps, approximately 250 miles (403 km). The race was Round 3 of the 1971 Australian Manufacturers' Championship.

The race, which is recognised as the sixth "Sandown 500", was won by Colin Bond driving a Holden LC Torana GTR XU-1.

== Classes ==
As a round of the 1971 Australian Manufacturers' Championship, the race featured five classes based on Capacity Price Units with the CP Unit value for each model determined by multiplying the engine capacity of the vehicle in litres by its retail price in Australian dollars.

- Class A : Up to 3000 CP Units
- Class B : 3001 to 4600 CP Units
- Class C : 4601 to 9000 CP Units
- Class D : 9001 to 18000 CP Units
- Class E : Over 18000 CP Units

== Results ==
Position	Drivers	No.	Car	Entrant	Class	Class Pos.	Laps
1	Colin Bond	44	Holden LC Torana GTR XU-1	Holden Dealer Team	D	1	130
2	Murray Carter	65	Ford XY Falcon GTHO Phase 3	John Harding Ford	E	1	125
3	Tony Roberts	40	Holden LC Torana GTR XU-1	Dustings of Burwood	D	2	124
4	Bruce McPhee	48	Holden LC Torana GTR XU-1	Kevin Dennis Motors	D	3	123
5	Bill Evans	27	Ford Escort Twin Cam	R. G. Wilson	C	1	122
6	Peter Brock	45	Holden LC Torana GTR XU-1	Holden Dealer Team	D	4	121
7	Graeme Blanchard	39	Holden LC Torana GTR XU-1	Blanchard Motors	D	5	120
8	Bob Forbes, John Millyard	34	Fiat 124 Coupe	Fiat Dealers Team	C	2	120
9	Frank Porter	43	Holden LC Torana GTR XU-1	Garry & Warren Smith - Oakleigh	D	6	120
10	Wayne Rogerson, Alan Mayne	23	Mazda Capella R.E. Coupe	Mazda Dealers Team	C	3	120
11	Lakis Manticas	19	Morris Cooper S	British Leyland Works	B	1	119
12	Bill Stanley, Mike Kable	16	Morris Cooper S	Marque Motors	B	2	117
13	Caroline O'Shannessy, Paul Gulson	15	Morris Cooper S	Marque Motors	B	3	117
14	Alan Keith	28	Ford Escort Twin Cam	Aladdin Vacuum Flasks	C	4	117
15	Doug Gardiner	21	Alfa Romeo 1750 GTV	A. F. & M. Beninca	D	7	115
16	Bryan Thomson	33	Alfa Romeo Giulia Super	Bryan Thomson	C	5	115
17	John Hall, George Garth	22	Mazda Capella	Mazda Dealers Team	B	4	114
18	Doug Grimson	62	Ford XW Falcon GTHO Phase 2	Doug Grimson	E	2	113
19	John Roxburgh, Jon Leighton	12	Datsun 1600	Datsun Racing Team	B	5	112
20	Doug Whiteford	1	Datsun 1200	Datsun Racing Team	A	1	112
21	John Leffler	5	Mazda 1300	John Palmer Motors	A	2	112
22	Geoff Perry	3	Mazda 1300	Geoff Perry	A	3	112
23	James Laing-Peach	2	Datsun 1200	Datsun Racing Team	A	4	112
24	Mel Mollison	4	Mazda 1300	Mel Mollison	A	5	110
25	Brian Sampson	9	Toyota Corolla	A.M.I. Racing Team	A	6	106
DNF	Kingsley Hibbard	63	Ford XY Falcon GTHO Phase 3	Wright Ford Motors	E	-	?
DNF	Malcolm Ramsay	42	Holden LC Torana GTR XU-1	City State Racing Team	D	-	?
DNF	Pat Peck, Jan Holland	38	Holden LC Torana GTR XU-1	D & P Traders Pty. Ltd.	D	-	?
DNF	Barry Ward	26	Ford Escort Twin Cam	Barry Ward	C	-	?
DNF	Ron McCormack	14	Honda 1300 Coupe	Melbourne Vehicle Sales	B	-	?
DNF	Phil Barnes, Bob Skelton	64	Ford XY Falcon GTHO Phase 3	Byrt Ford	E	-	81
DNF	Barry Seton	31	Ford Escort Twin Cam	Barry Seton	C	-	69
DNF	John Walker	41	Holden LC Torana GTR XU-1	City State Racing Team	D	-	47
DNF	Bill Gates	25	Ford Escort Twin Cam	Morley Ford	C	-	43
DNF	John French	61	Ford XY Falcon GTHO Phase 3	Ford Motor Company of Australia	E	-	8
DNF	Allan Moffat	60	Ford XY Falcon GTHO Phase 3	Ford Motor Company of Australia	E	-	3
Disq	Jim Murcott	30	Ford Escort Twin Cam	Jim Murcott	C	-	123
DNS	Bill Evans	8	Toyota Corolla	A.M.I. Racing Team	A	-	-

=== Notes ===
- Attendance: 25,000
- Number of entries in Official Programme: 44
- Starters: 37
- Finishers: 25
- Pole position: Allan Moffat, 1 minute 21.4 seconds
- Race time of winning car: 3 hours 5 minutes 21.0 seconds

Preceded by 1970 Sandown Three Hour 250	Sandown 250; 1971	Succeeded by 1972 Sandown 250
