= 1971 Rothmans 250 =

Coordinates: 28°0′59″S 153°22′34″E

The 1971 Rothmans 250 was motor race for Group E Series Production Touring Cars. It was staged on 7 November 1971 at the Surfers Paradise International Raceway in Queensland, Australia, over a 250-mile distance. The race, which was Heat 5 of the 1971 Australian Manufacturers' Championship, was won by Allan Moffat driving a Ford Falcon GTHO.

== Classes ==
As a heat of the 1971 Australian Manufacturers' Championship, classes were defined by a Capacity/Price Units formula with values for each model calculated by multiplying the engine capacity in litres by the retail price.

== Results ==
Position	Drivers	No.	Car	Entrant	Laps
1	Allan Moffat	60E	Ford XY Falcon GTHO Phase 3	Ford Motor Co	125
2	Leo Geoghegan	43D	Chrysler VH Valiant Charger R/T	Austral Motors	125
3	Peter Brock	55D	Holden LC Torana GTR-XU1	Holden Dealer Team	124
4	Colin Bond	54D	Holden LC Torana GTR-XU1	Holden Dealer Team	124
5	John French	61E	Ford XY Falcon GTHO Phase 3	Ford Motor Co	123
6	Doug Chivas		Chrysler VH Valiant Charger R/T	Austral Motors	123
	Class A : Up to 3000 CP Units				
1	Jim Laing-Peach		Datsun 1200	Datsun Racing Team	
2	Barry Tapsall		Datsun 1200	Datsun Racing Team	
3	Mel Mollison	4A	Mazda 1300	Mel Mollison	
4	Peter Le Francke		Toyota Corolla	AMI Racing Team	
5	Doug Whiteford		Datsun 1200	Datsun Racing Team	
6	Paul McInerney		Chrysler Valiant Galant 1300		
7	Middleton		Mazda		
?	Paul Buda	7A	Honda Scamp		
	Class B : 3001 - 4600 CP Units				
1	Lakis Manticas		Morris Cooper S	British Leyland Works Team	
2	Paul Gulson		Morris Cooper S	Marque Motors	
3	Bruce Stewart		Datsun 1600	WH Motors	
4	Jenny Parker		Morris Cooper S		
5	Keith Henry		Morris Cooper S		
6	Graeme Finan		Morris Cooper S		
?			Datsun 1600		
?	Keith Shaw, Dennis Caswell		Honda Coupe 9		
?	O'Shanesy, English		Morris Cooper S	Marque Motors	
DNF	Joe Camilleri		Morris Clubman GT		
	Class C : 4601 - 9000 CP Units				
1	Eric Olsen		Ford Escort Twin Cam	Eric Olsen	
2	Lyndon Arnel		Ford Escort Twin Cam	Tony Motson's Performance Tune	
3	Bob Forbes		Fiat 124 Coupe	Fiat Dealers Team	
?	John Piper		Ford Escort Twin Cam		
?	Jim Murcott		Ford Escort Twin Cam		
?	George Giesberts		Holden LC Torana GTR		
?	Warren Gracie		Holden LC Torana GTR		
?	Garry Cooke		Mazda Capella RE		
?	Charlie Lund		Mazda Capella RE		
?	Terry Friar		Mazda Capella RE		
	Class D : 9001 - 18000 CP Units				
1	Leo Geoghegan	43D	Chrysler VH Valiant Charger R/T	Austral Motors	125
2	Peter Brock	55D	Holden LC Torana GTR-XU1	Holden Dealer Team	124
3	Colin Bond	54D	Holden LC Torana GTR-XU1	Holden Dealer Team	124
5	Doug Chivas		Chrysler VH Valiant Charger R/T	Austral Motors	123
6	Tony Paul		Chrysler VH Valiant Charger R/T		
	Class E : 18001 and Over CP Units				
1	Allan Moffat	60E	Ford XY Falcon GTHO Phase 3	Ford Motor Co	125
2	John French	61E	Ford XY Falcon GTHO Phase 3	Ford Motor Co	123
DNF	David McKay		Ford XY Falcon GTHO Phase 3	Finnie Ford	
DNF	Phil Barnes		Ford XY Falcon GTHO Phase 3	Brian Byrt Ford	
DNF	Rod Donovan		Ford Falcon GTHO		

The winning car completed the race in 3 hours 11 minutes 46.1 seconds at an average speed of 83 mph (133 km/h).

The above results table does not list all competitors, given that there were "over forty starters" in the race.
