= 1971 Castrol Trophy =

Motor racing meeting

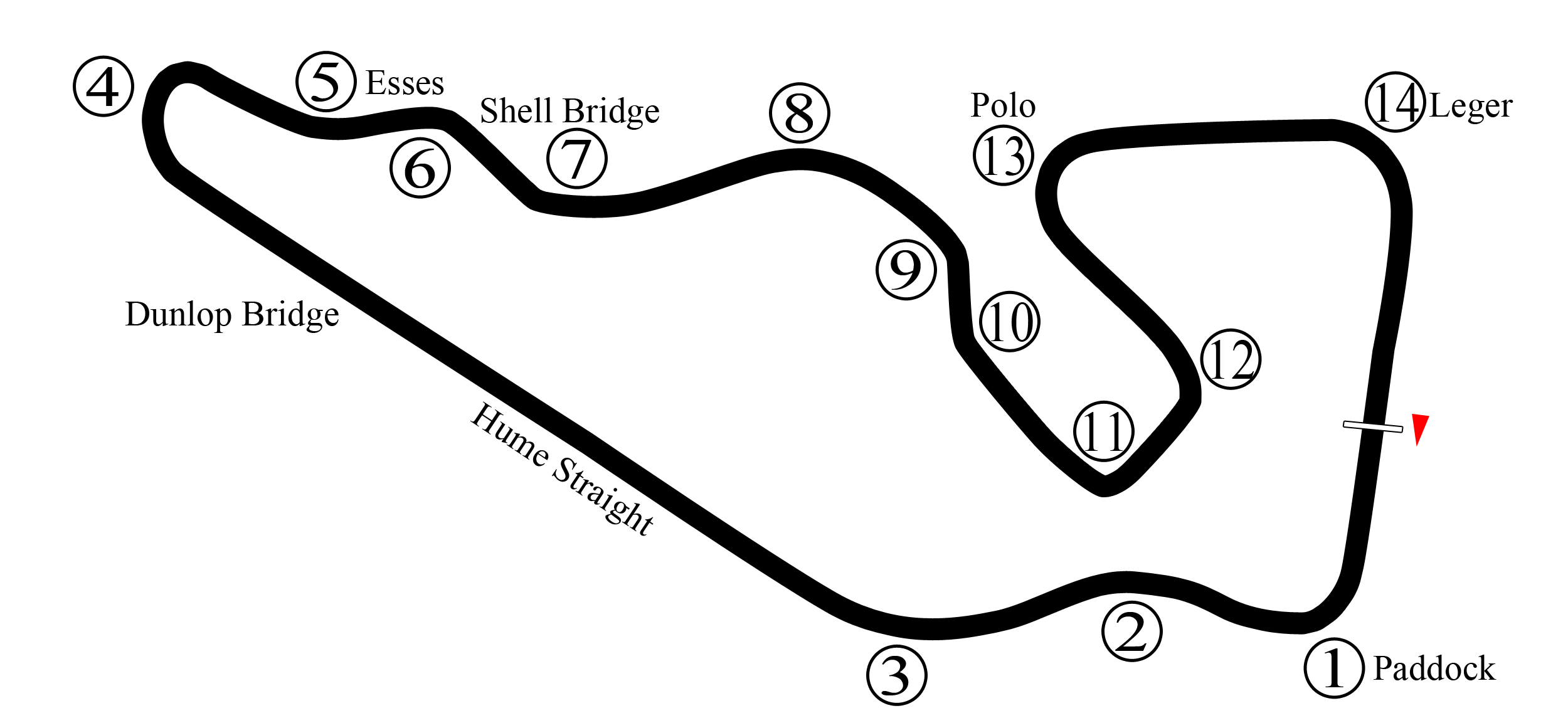
Layout of the Warwick Farm Raceway (1960-1973)

The 1971 Castrol Trophy was an endurance race for Group E Series Production Touring Cars. The event, which was staged at the Warwick Farm circuit in New South Wales, Australia on 2 May 1971, was Round 2 of the 1971 Australian Manufacturers' Championship.

The race was won by Colin Bond driving a Holden Torana GTR XU-1 for the Holden Dealer Team.

== Classes ==
As the race was an Australian Manufacturers’ Championship round, the field was divided into five classes, based on “CP Units”. The engine capacity, in litres, was multiplied by the retail price, in Australian Dollars, to arrive at a CP Unit value for each competing model.

- Class A : 0 to 3000 CP Units
- Class B : 3001 - 4600 CP Units
- Class C : 4601 - 9000 CP Units
- Class D : 9001 - 18000 CP Units
- Class E : Over 18000 CP Units

== Results ==
Position	Drivers	No.	Car	Entrant	Class	Class Pos.	Laps
1	Colin Bond	22	Holden LC Torana GTR XU-1	Holden Dealer Team	D	1	100
2	Peter Brock	23	Holden LC Torana GTR XU-1	Holden Dealer Team	D	2	100
3	Allan Moffat	40	Ford XW Falcon GTHO	Ford Motor Company	E	1	99
4	Don Smith	27	Holden LC Torana GTR XU-1	W.H. Motors P/L	D	3	98
5	Barry Seton	21	Ford Escort Twin Cam	Barry Seton	C	1	96
6	Bill Evans	18	Ford Escort Twin Cam	Bill Evans Developments	C	2	96
7	Bob Morris	31	Holden LC Torana GTR XU-1	Mark IV Car Air Conditioning	D	4	95
8	George Giesberts, Scott Townsend	16	Ford Escort Twin Cam	Smith Ford, Clayfield	C	3	95
9	Bob Forbes	12	Fiat 124 Coupe	Fiat Dealers Team	C	4	95
10	Jim Murcott	20	Ford Escort Twin Cam	Jim Murcott	C	5	?
11	Bruce Allison	19	Ford Escort Twin Cam	Bruce Allison	C	6	?
12	Lakis Manticas	4	Morris Cooper S	British Leyland Works Team	B	1	94
13	Barry Sharp	38	Ford XY Falcon GT	Brabham Ford	E	2	94
14	Bruce McPhee	42	Holden HT Monaro GTS 350	Bardahl International Oil Co.	E	3	94
15	Bruce Stewart	10	Datsun 1600 SSS	W.H. Motors P/L	B	2	93
16	Bill Stanley	5	Morris Cooper S	Marque Motors	B	3	92
17	Norm Beechey	32	Chrysler VG Valiant Pacer	Shell Racing	D	5	?
18	John French	41	Ford XW Falcon GTHO	Ford Motor Company	E	4	90
19	Doug Whiteford	3	Datsun 1200	Datsun Racing Team	A	1	90
20	Jim Laing-Peach	1	Mazda 1300	Mazda House	A	2	90
DNF	Murray Carter	37	Ford XW Falcon GTHO	Bob Rollington	E	-	?
DNF	Don Holland	30	Holden LC Torana GTR XU-1	Max Wright Motors P/L	D	-	?
DNF	Warren Gracie	11	Holden Torana GTR	Waterloo High Perf. Tuning Centre	C	-	?
DNF	John Piper	17	Ford Escort Twin Cam	Bill Evans Developments	B	-	?
DNF	Paul Gulson	6	Morris Cooper S	Marque Motors	B	-	?
DNF	Doug Chivas	34	Chrysler VG Valiant Pacer	Geoghegan's Sporty Cars	D	-	83
DNF	Geoff Hunter	35	Chrysler VG Valiant Pacer	Harvey Drew P/L	D	-	26
Disq	Les Grose	9	Morris Cooper S	Les Grose	B	-	92
DNS	Clive Millis, Ken Hastings	15	Mazda Capella Rotary	Clive Millis Motors P/L	C	-	-
DNS	Digby Cooke	28	Holden LC Torana GTR XU-1	Fair Deal Car Sales	D	-	-

The winner's race time for the 100 lap, 225 mile race was 3 hours 6 minutes 29.5 seconds.

From the 30 entries for the race, 28 cars started, with seven failing to finish.
