= 1971 Rothmans 3 Hour =

Layout of the Mount Panorama Circuit (1938-1986)

The 1971 Rothmans 3 Hour was motor race for Group E Series Production Touring Cars. It was staged at the Mount Panorama Circuit near Bathurst, in New South Wales, Australia on 12 April 1971. The race, which was Heat 1 of the 1971 Australian Manufacturers' Championship, was won by Allan Moffat driving a Ford Falcon GTHO.

== Classes ==
As a heat of the 1971 Australian Manufacturers' Championship, classes were defined by a Capacity/Price Units formula with the value for each model calculated by multiplying the engine capacity in litres by the retail price.

- Class A : 0 to 3,000 CP units
- Class B : 3,001 to 4,600 CP units
- Class C : 4,601 to 9,000 CP units
- Class D : 9,001 to 18,000 CP units
- Class E : Over 18,000 CP units

== Results ==
Position	Drivers	No.	Car	Entrant	Class	Laps
1	Allan Moffat	40	Ford XW Falcon GTHO Phase 2	Ford Motor Company of Australia	E	65
2	John French	41	Ford XW Falcon GTHO Phase 2	Ford Motor Company of Australia	E	65
3	Peter Brock	23	Holden LC Torana GTR XU-1	Holden Dealer Team	D	65
4	Colin Bond	22	Holden LC Torana GTR XU-1	Holden Dealer Team	D	64
5	Don Holland	26	Holden LC Torana GTR XU-1	Max Wright Motors Pty Ltd	D	64
6	Bob Morris	31	Holden LC Torana GTR XU-1	Mark VI Car Air Conditioning	D	63
7	Doug Chivas	34	Chrysler VG Valiant Pacer	Geoghegans Sporty Cars	D	62
8	Mick Brown	24	Holden LC Torana GTR XU-1	M Brown	D	62
9	Bill Evans	18	Ford Escort Twin Cam	Bill Evans Developments	C	61
10	Barry Seton	21	Ford Escort Twin Cam	Barry Seton	C	61
11	Murray Carter	37	Ford XW Falcon GTHO Phase 2	Bob Rollington	E	60
12	Bob Forbes, John Millyard	13	Fiat 124 Coupe	Fiat Dealers Team	C	60
13	Norm Beechey	32	Chrysler VG Valiant Pacer	Shell Racing	D	60
14	Jim Murcott	20	Ford Escort Twin Cam	J Murcott	C	60
15	Bruce McPhee	42	Holden HT Monaro GTS350	Bardahl International Oil Corporation	E	57
16	Bert Fenton	38	Ford XW Falcon GTHO Phase 2	BP Muirfield	E	57
17	Lakis Manticas	4	Morris Cooper S	British Leyland Works	B	57
18	Bill Stanley	5	Morris Cooper S	Marque Motors	B	57
19	Doug Whiteford	3	Datsun 1200	Datsun Racing Team	A	55
20	Peter Cray, Carl Kennedy	1	Mazda 1300	Tynan Motors	A	53
21	Caroline O'Shanessy	8	Morris Cooper S	Miss C O'Shanessy	B	21
DNF	Phillip Edwards, N Ledingham	7	Morris Cooper S	Phillip Edwards	C	?
DNF	G Kratzman, Eric Olsen	19	Ford Escort Twin Cam	G Kratzman	C	?
DNF	Paul Gulson	6	Morris Cooper S	Marque Motors	B	?
DNF	Peter White, D Goodwin	25	Holden LC Torana GTR XU-1	Peter White	D	?
DNF	Les Grose	9	Morris Cooper S	Les Grose	B	?
DNF	Don Smith	27	Holden LC Torana GTR XU-1	WH Motors	D	?
DNF	James Laing-Peach	14	Mazda Capella Rotary	Mazda House	C	44
DNF	Geoff Leeds	30	Holden LC Torana GTR XU-1	Commonwealth Industrial Gases Ltd	D	37
DNF	Clive Millis, Terry Southall	15	Mazda Capella Rotary	Clive Millis Motors	C	34
DNF	Leo Geoghegan	36	Chrysler VG Valiant Pacer	Geoghegans Sporty Cars	D	31
DNF	Phil Barnes	39	Ford XW Falcon GTHO Phase 2	Byrt Ford Pty Ltd	E	29
DNF	Geoff Hunter, Joe Butta	35	Chrysler VG Valiant Pacer	Harvey Drew Pty Ltd	D	29
DNF	Ross Hewison	16	Ford Escort Twin Cam	John Hiles Ford	C	19
DNF	Alan Cant, Bob Cook	33	Chrysler VG Valiant Pacer	Central Motors (Nepean) Pty Ltd	D	3

35 cars started the event and 14 failed to finish.

Allan Moffat recorded the fastest practice time (2:46.4) and the fastest race lap (2:46).
