= 1972 Chesterfield 250 =

Layout of the Adelaide International Raceway

The 1972 Chesterfield 250 was an endurance race for Series Production Touring Cars complying with CAMS Group E regulations. The race, which was Round 1 of the 1972 Australian Manufacturers' Championship, was held at the Adelaide International Raceway near Virginia in South Australia on 27 August 1972 over 165 laps, totalling 247.5 miles. The field was divided into four classes, split via "CP Units", where the engine capacity of the vehicle (in litres) was multiplied by the retail price of the vehicle (in dollars) to give a CP Unit (i.e. Capacity Price Unit) value.

Results were as follows:

Position	Drivers	No.	Car	Entrant	Laps
1	Colin Bond	24	Holden Torana GTR XU-1	Holden Dealer Team	165
2	Peter Brock	28	Holden Torana GTR XU-1	Holden Dealer Team	165
3	Stewart McLeod	31	Holden Torana GTR XU-1	Stewart McLeod	164
4	Fred Gibson	8	Ford Falcon GTHO Phase III	Ford Motor Co of Aust Ltd	158
5	Noel Hurd	11	Chrysler Valiant Charger R/T E49	Australian Motors	157
6	John Stoopman	26	Holden Torana GTR XU-1	John Stoopman	155
7	John Goss	12	Ford Falcon GTHO Phase III	McLeod Ford	
	Class A : Up to 3,000 CP Units				
1	Geoff Perry	67	Mazda 1300	Bainbridge Motors	
2	Jim Laing-Peach	73	Datsun 1200	Datsun Racing Team	
3	Jon Leighton	63	Datsun 1200	John Leighton	
4	Tony Farrell	64	Mazda 1300	Bainbridge Motors	
5	Roger Bonhomme	66	Chrysler Valiant Galant	Collins Chrysler	
6	Mel McEwin	65	Toyota Corolla	Mel McEwin	
DNF	Ray Lintott	71	Datsun 1200	LC Giddings & Son	
	Class B : 3,001 to 9,000 CP Units				
1	Jim Murcott	40	Ford Escort Twin Cam	Brian Wood Ford	
2	Max Grayson	46	Ford Escort Twin Cam	Max Grayson	
3	Allan Keith	42	Ford Escort Twin Cam	Allan R Keith	
4	Bob Holden	52	Ford Escort Twin Cam	RJ Holden	
DNF	Lakis Manticas	38	Ford Escort Twin Cam	Slideaway Car Roofs Pty Ltd	
DNF	John Piper	39	Ford Escort Twin Cam	Evans Motor Service	
DNF	Herb Vines	50	Ford Escort Twin Cam	HL Vines	
	Class C : 9,001 to 18,000 CP Units				
1	Colin Bond	24	Holden Torana GTR XU-1	Holden Dealer Team	165
2	Peter Brock	28	Holden Torana GTR XU-1	Holden Dealer Team	165
3	Stewart McLeod	31	Holden Torana GTR XU-1	Stewart McLeod	164
4	John Stoopman	26	Holden Torana GTR XU-1	John Stoopman	155
5	Ray Harrison	25	Alfa Romeo 1750 GTV	AF & M Beninca Pty Ltd	
DNF	Paul Beranger	34	Holden Torana GTR XU-1	Truform Engine Reconditioning	
	Class D : Over 18,000 CP Units				
1	Fred Gibson	8	Ford Falcon GTHO Phase III	Ford Motor Co of Aust Ltd	158
2	Noel Hurd	11	Chrysler Valiant Charger R/T E49	Australian Motors	157
3	John Goss	12	Ford Falcon GTHO Phase III	McLeod Ford	
DNF	Tom Naughton	4	Chrysler Valiant Charger R/T E49	Eastside Chrysler	
DNF	Allan Moffat	1	Ford Falcon GTHO Phase III	Ford Motor Co of Aust Ltd	
DNF	Murray Carter	3	Ford Falcon GTHO Phase III	Murray Carter	
