= 1971 Australian Manufacturers' Championship =

The 1971 Australian Manufacturers' Championship was a CAMS sanctioned Australian motor racing title open to Group E Series Production Touring Cars. The championship, which was the inaugural Australian Manufacturers' Championship, was won by Holden.

== Calendar ==
The championship was contested over a five heat series, with each heat being a single race staged over a minimum duration of three hours.

Heat	Race	Circuit	Date	Winning driver	Car	Entrant	Report
1	Rothmans 3 Hour	Mount Panorama	12 April	(Canada) Allan Moffat	Ford XW Falcon GTHO	Ford Motor Company of Australia	Report
2	Castrol Trophy	Warwick Farm	2 May	(Australia) Colin Bond	Holden LC Torana GTR XU-1	Holden Dealer Team	Report
3	Sandown 250	Sandown Raceway	12 September	(Australia) Colin Bond	Holden LC Torana GTR XU-1	Holden Dealer Team	Report
4	Phillip Island 500K	Phillip Island	24 October	(Australia) Colin Bond	Holden LC Torana GTR XU-1	Holden Dealer Team	Report
5	Rothmans 250	Surfers Paradise	7 November	(Canada) Allan Moffat	Ford XY Falcon GTHO	Ford Motor Company	Report

== Class Structure ==
Cars competed in five classes based on a Capacity / Price index in which the engine capacity in litres was multiplied by the retail price to determine the CP units for each model.

- Class A: 0-3,000 CP units
- Class B: 3,001-4,600 CP units
- Class C: 4,601-9,000 CP units
- Class D: 9,001-18,000 CP units
- Class E: Over 18,000 CP units

== Points system ==
Championship points were awarded on a 9-8-7-6-5-4-3-2-1 basis for the first nine positions in each class plus 4-3-2-1 for the first four positions outright. Only the best placed car from a manufacturer was eligible to score points.

== Results ==
Position	Manufacturer	Bat	War	San	Phi	Sur	Total
1	Holden	11	13	13	13	10	60
2	Ford	13	11	12	9	13	58

Note: Championship placings below second position are not known.
