= Honda 1300 =

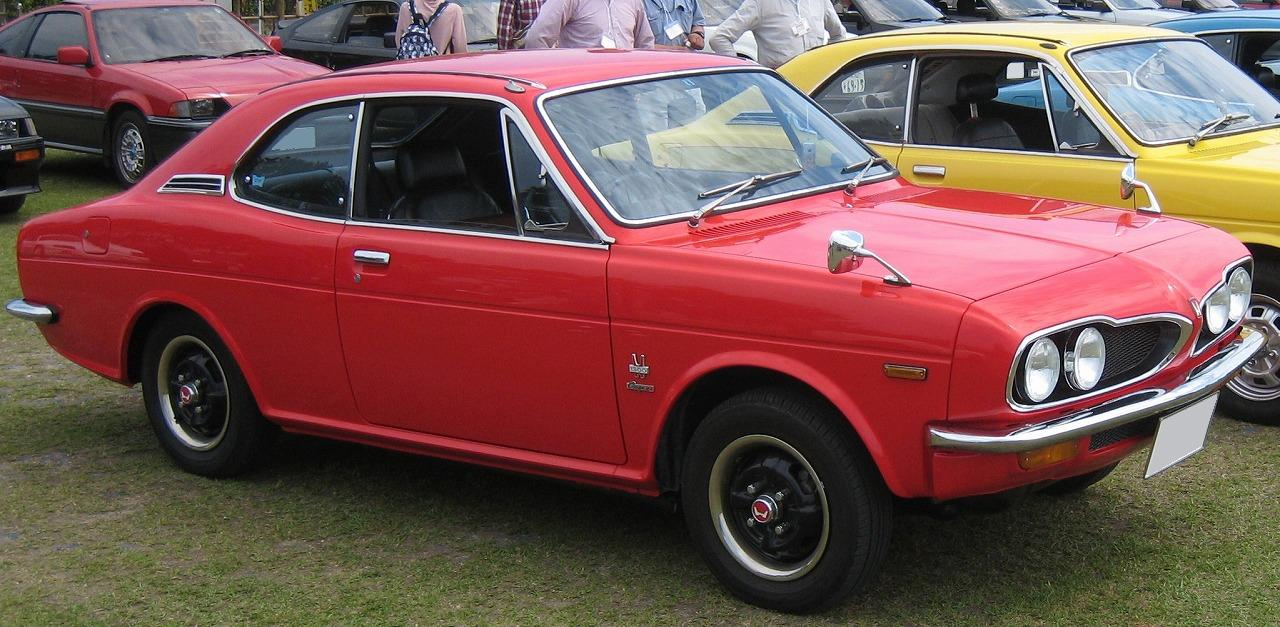
- 1970–1971 Honda 1300 Coupe7 S

Overview
- Manufacturer: Honda
- Also called: Honda H1300; Honda 77/99 (sedan, 1969–1972); Honda Coupe7/9 (coupé, 1970–1971); Honda Coupe Golden/Dynamic Series (1971–1972)
- Production: 1969–1972
- Assembly: Suzuka Plant, Suzuka, Mie, Japan

Body and chassis
- Class: Compact car
- Body style: 2-door coupé (1970–1972); 4-door sedan (1969–1972)
- Layout: Front-engine, front-wheel-drive

Powertrain
- Engine: 1298 cc H1300E air-cooled I4
- Transmission: 4-speed manual; 3-speed automatic

Dimensions
- Wheelbase: 2,250 mm (88.6 in)
- Length: 3,885 mm (153.0 in) (1969–1970 sedan); 4,020 mm (158.3 in) (1970–1972 sedan); 4,140 mm (163.0 in) (1970–1971 coupé); 4,085–4,160 mm (160.8–163.8 in) (1971–1972 coupé)
- Width: 1,465 mm (57.7 in) (sedan); 1,495 mm (58.9 in) (coupé)
- Height: 1,320 mm (52 in) (coupé); 1,345 mm (53 in) (sedan)
- Curb weight: 860–935 kg (1,896–2,061 lb) (sedan); 870–925 kg (1,918–2,039 lb) (coupé)

Chronology
- Successor: Honda 145

The Honda 1300 is an automobile which was produced by Japanese manufacturer Honda from 1969 to 1972. The largest car manufactured by the company to that point (above the S800 sports car), the front-wheel-drive 1300 was released as a sedan or a coupé, and was intended to compete primarily against other Japanese cars such as the Toyota Corona, Mazda Capella, Mitsubishi Galant, and Nissan Bluebird. An ambitious project spearheaded by Soichiro Honda, it was plagued by engineering delays and sold at a high price compared to its competition. However, lessons learned from it led to the successful debut of the Life kei car in 1971 and Civic subcompact car in 1972, and to the 1300/145's successors, the Accord and Prelude, in 1976 and 1978.

== History ==
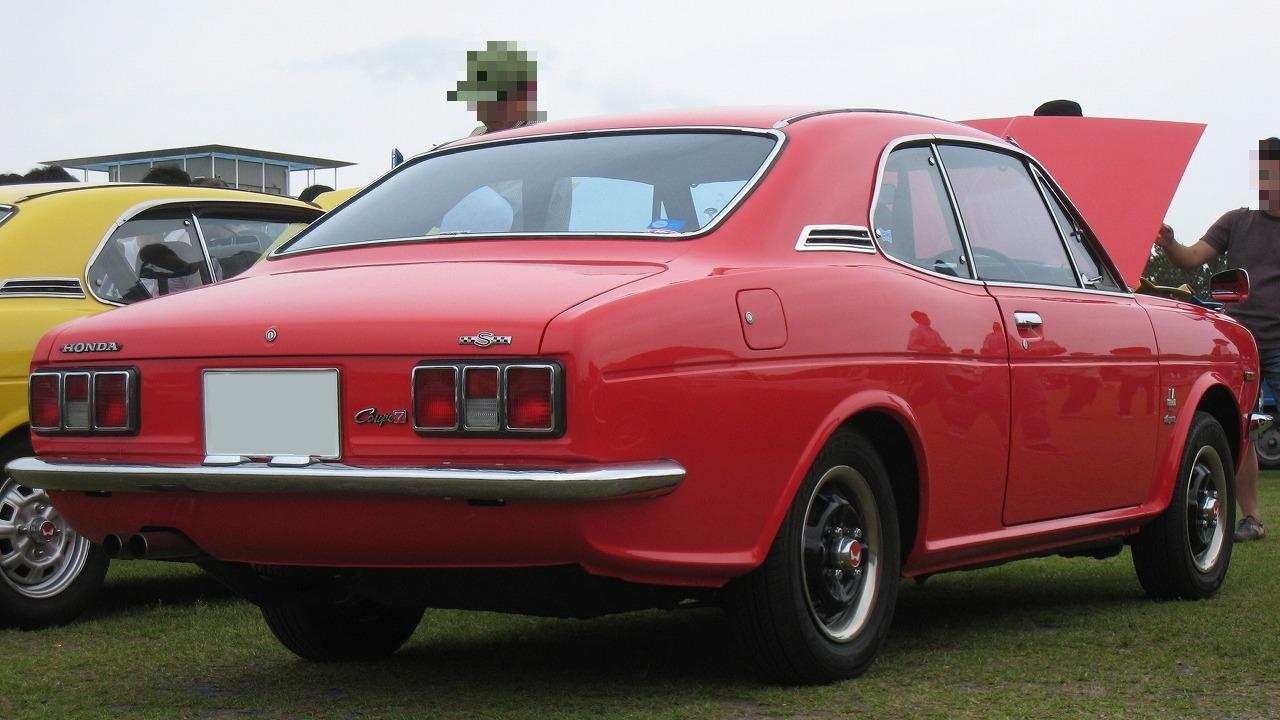
1970–1971 1300 Coupe7 S

Frequent changes of plan during development, sometimes made on a daily basis, hampered production. Mr. Honda was adamant the engine needed to be air rather than water cooled, arguing that "since water-cooled engines eventually use air to cool the water, we can implement air cooling from the very beginning. That will eliminate the problem of water leaks, and it will facilitate maintenance. The question here is how to reduce the loud noise characteristic of an air-cooled engine to a level commensurate with a water-cooled unit."

In May 1969, final specifications and prices for the Japanese market were announced. There were originally two engine versions, the "Series 77" with a single carburetor making 100 PS (74 kW; 99 hp) (SAE), and the "Series 99" with four carburetors at 115 PS (85 kW; 113 hp) (SAE) (detuned to 95 PS (70 kW; 94 hp) and 110 PS (81 kW; 108 hp) in December 1969): the less powerful car was listed with four levels of trim offered (Standard, Custom, S and Deluxe), of which the top three were also available with the four carburetor engine. The manufacturer's ex-works prices ranged from ¥488,000 for the entry level "Series 77" standard saloon to ¥710,000 for the "Series 99" Custom saloon. Automatic transmission and air-conditioning were optional. Six of the seven versions offered were priced noticeably above the slower and less powerful Toyota Corolla Deluxe 4-door sedan, then retailing at ¥520,000: for this price Toyota included delivery to the Tokyo area.

The car had been introduced at the Tokyo Motor Show in October 1968, but production only got under way during the early months of 1969. In May 1969 the Honda 1300 went on sale in Japan. It was reported at the time that launch was delayed by a couple of months because company president Soichiro Honda found the styling of the car as presented at the Tokyo Motor Show the previous year unacceptably bland and called for a redesign. It was not lost on contemporary commentators that Honda himself at the time owned and frequently drove a Pontiac Firebird, and the split air intakes on the front of the Honda 1300 as it came to market suggest that Honda design personnel were also aware of the boss's fondness for his Pontiac.

The two-door coupé bodystyle, with a longer and sportier looking front end, was added to the lineup in February 1970. The same two engines 95 and 110 PS (70 and 81 kW; 94 and 108 hp) were on offer in these cars, marketed as the Coupe7 and the Coupe9 with the same trim levels as the 77/99 sedan. A 3-speed automatic transmission was later added as option a month later, exclusively for 77 sedan and Coupe7. The engine power of the automatic models was detuned to 80 PS (59 kW; 79 hp).

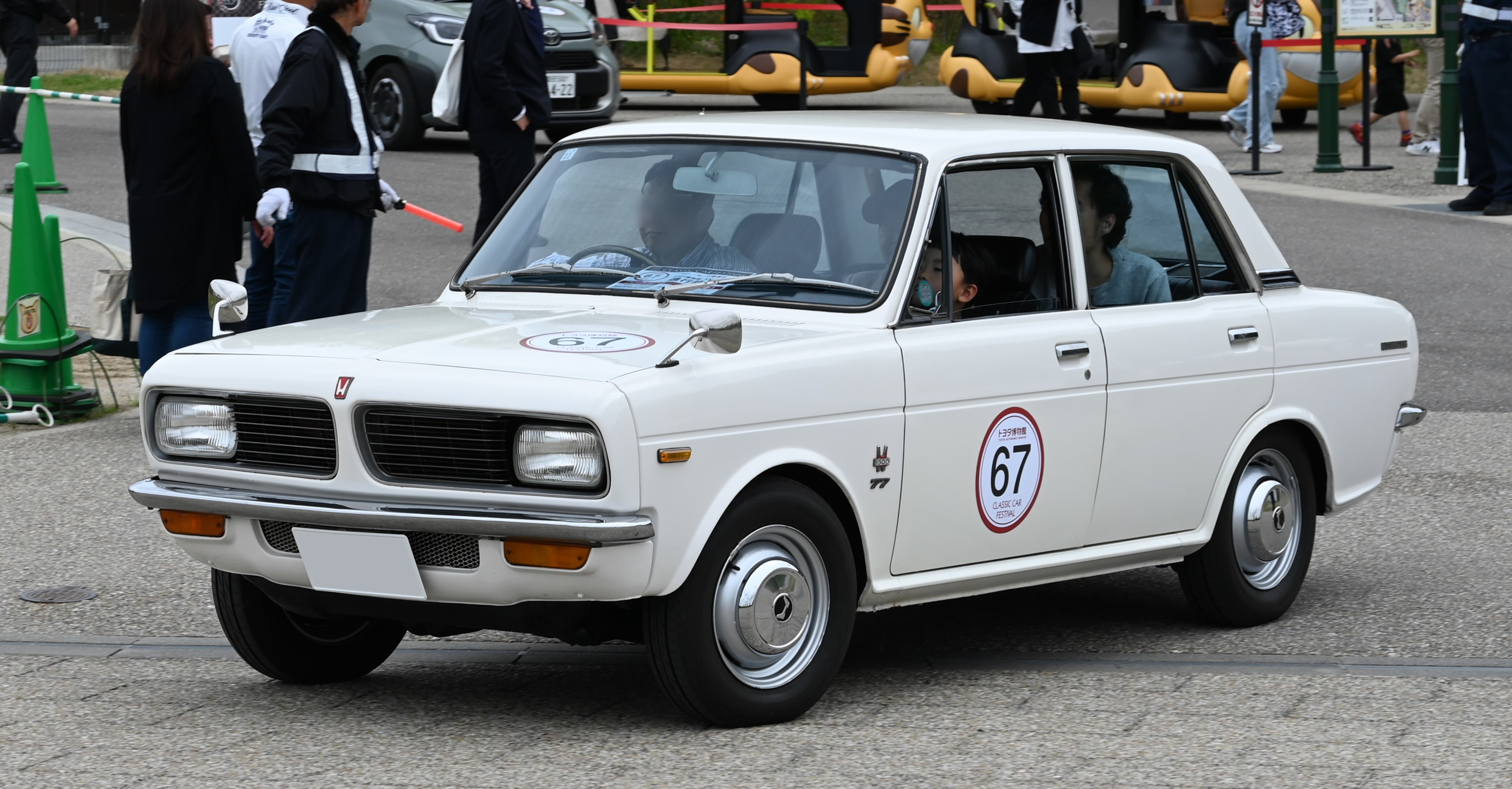
1969–1970 1300 77 Deluxe

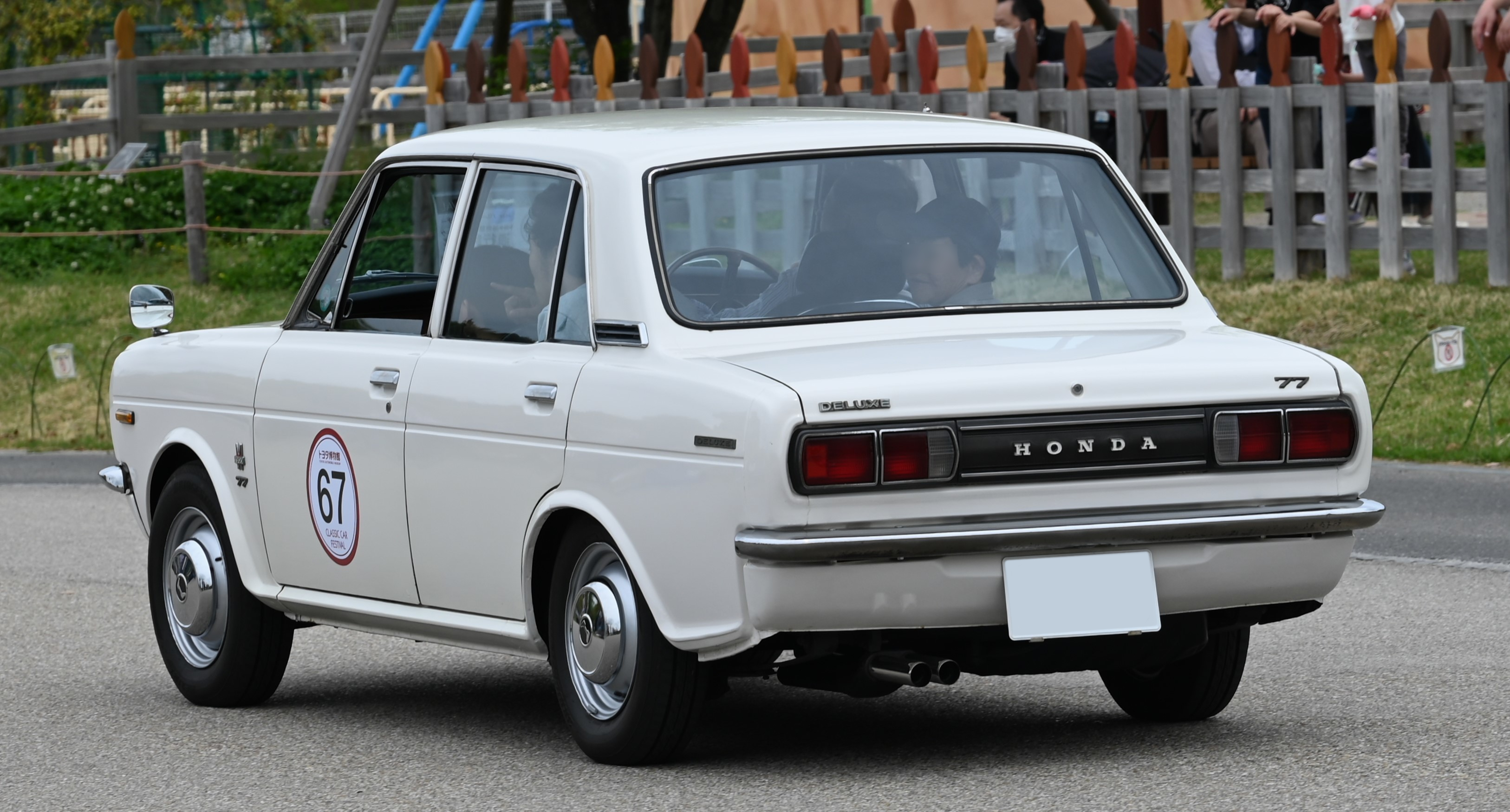
1969–1970 1300 77 Deluxe

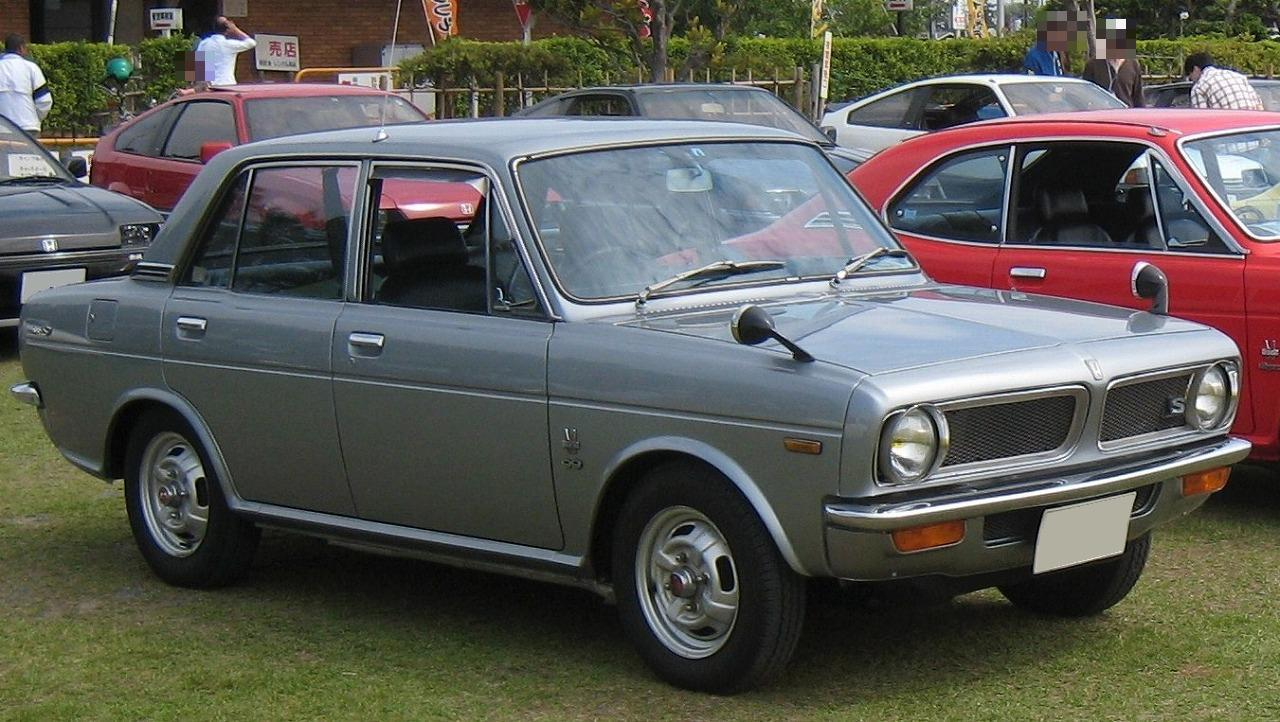
1969–1970 1300 99 S

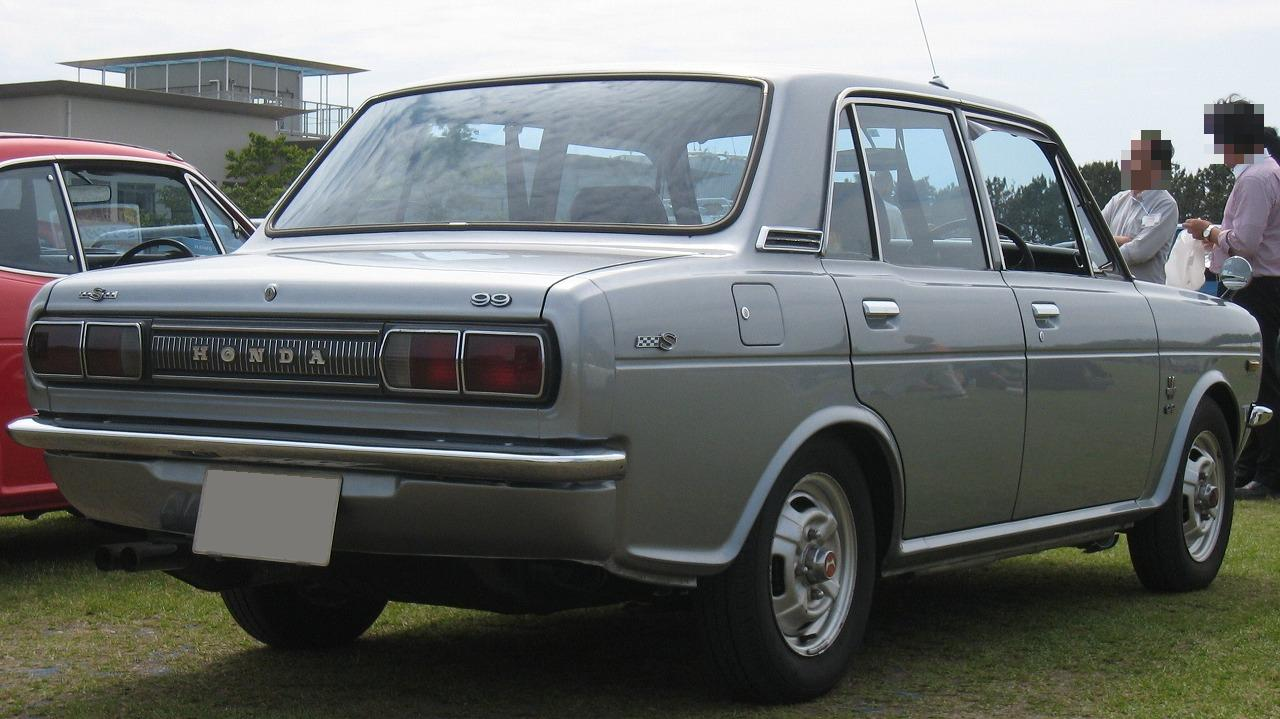
1969–1970 1300 99 S

In November 1970, the 77 sedan was refreshed with new front fascia with round headlights and new taillights, while the four carburetors 99 sedan and 1300 name were dropped. The facelifted coupé arrived in June 1971 – rebranded as the Coupe Golden Series and Coupe Dynamic Series – replacing the Coupe7 and Coupe9 names. The Golden Series featured the same front fascia as the facelifted 77 sedan and sold as Standard, Deluxe and Custom, while the Dynamic Series retained the same design as before but with new vertical grille and an additional trunk ornament. The trims were also renamed to SL, GT, GL and the four carburetors GTL.

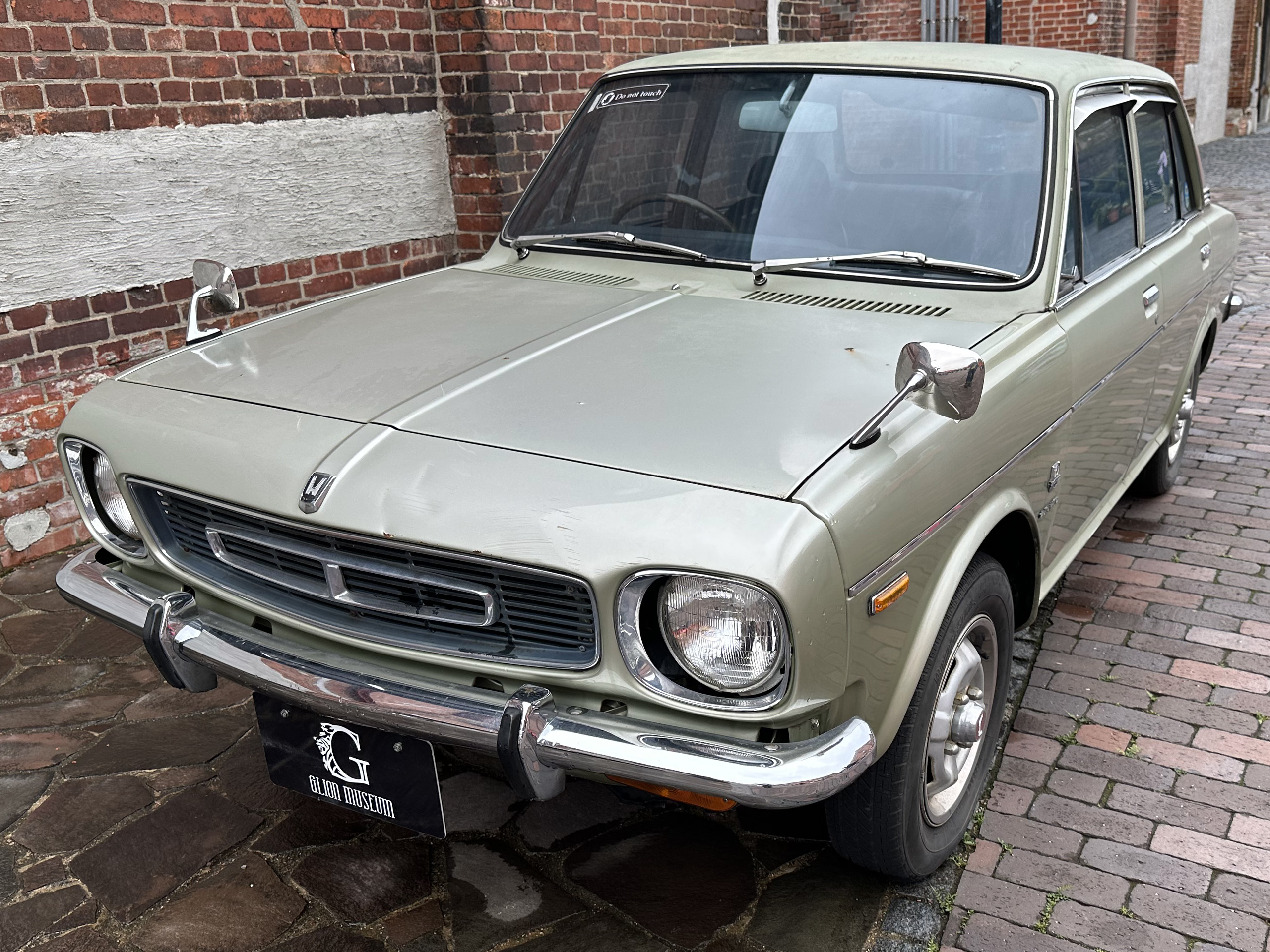
1971–1972 77 Custom

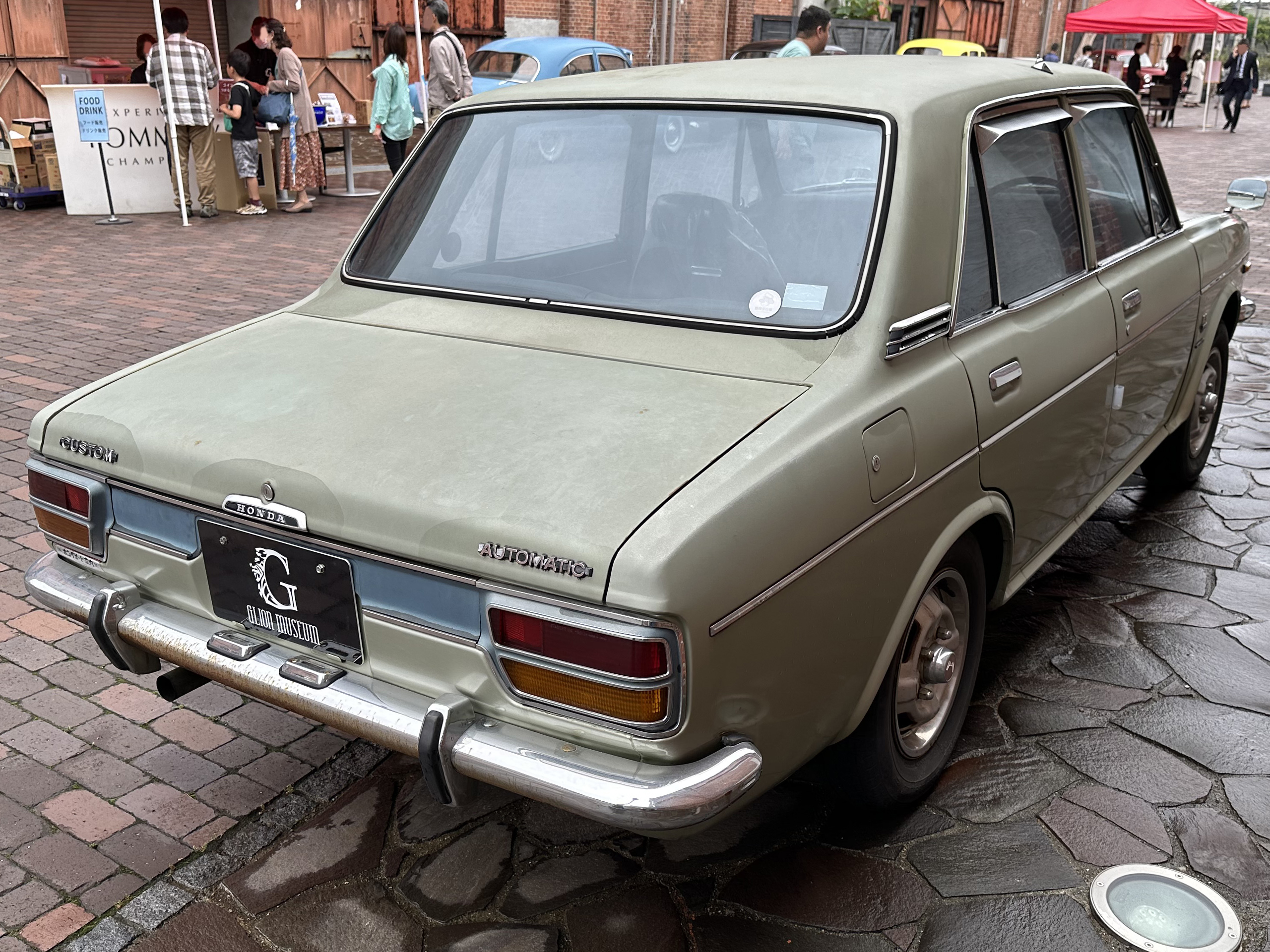
1971–1972 77 Custom

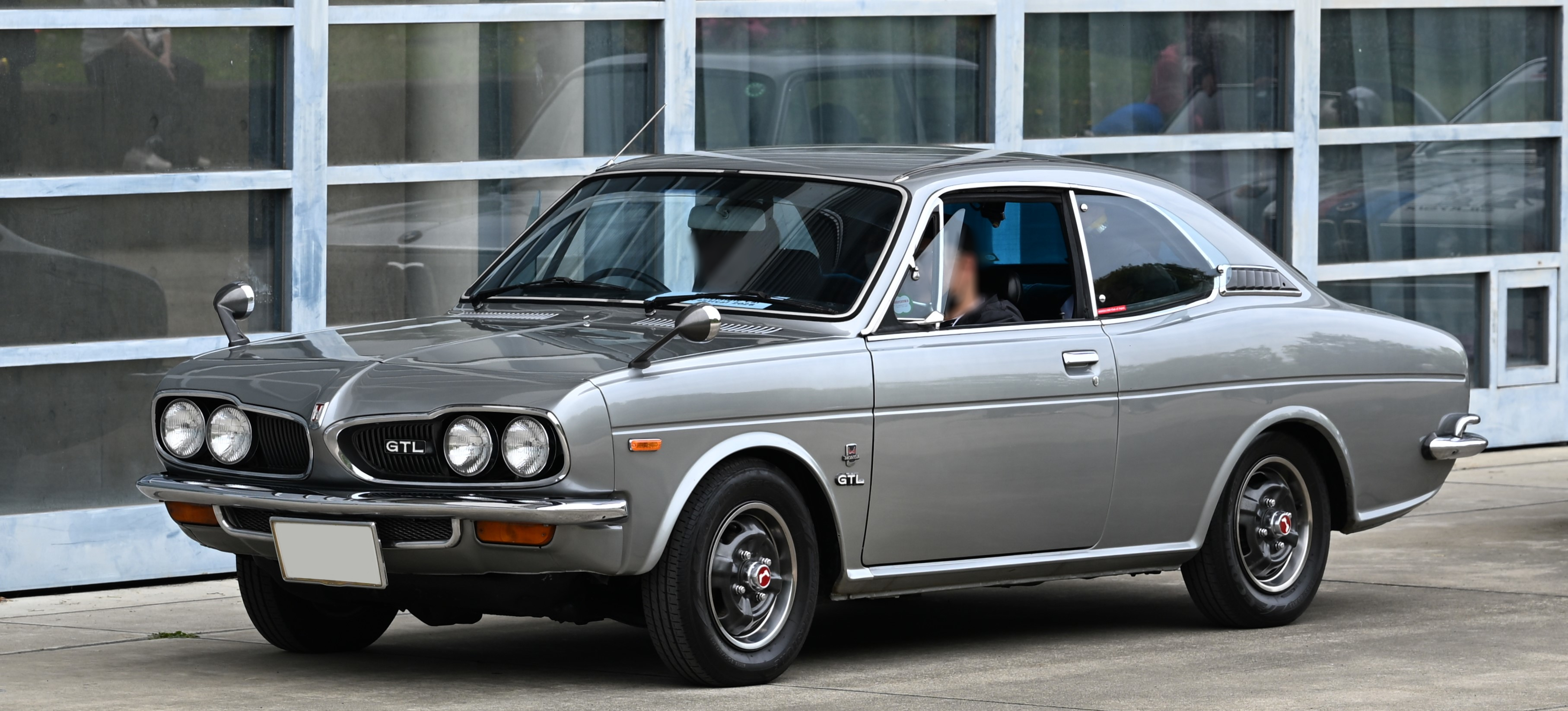
1971–1972 Honda Coupe Dynamic Series GTL

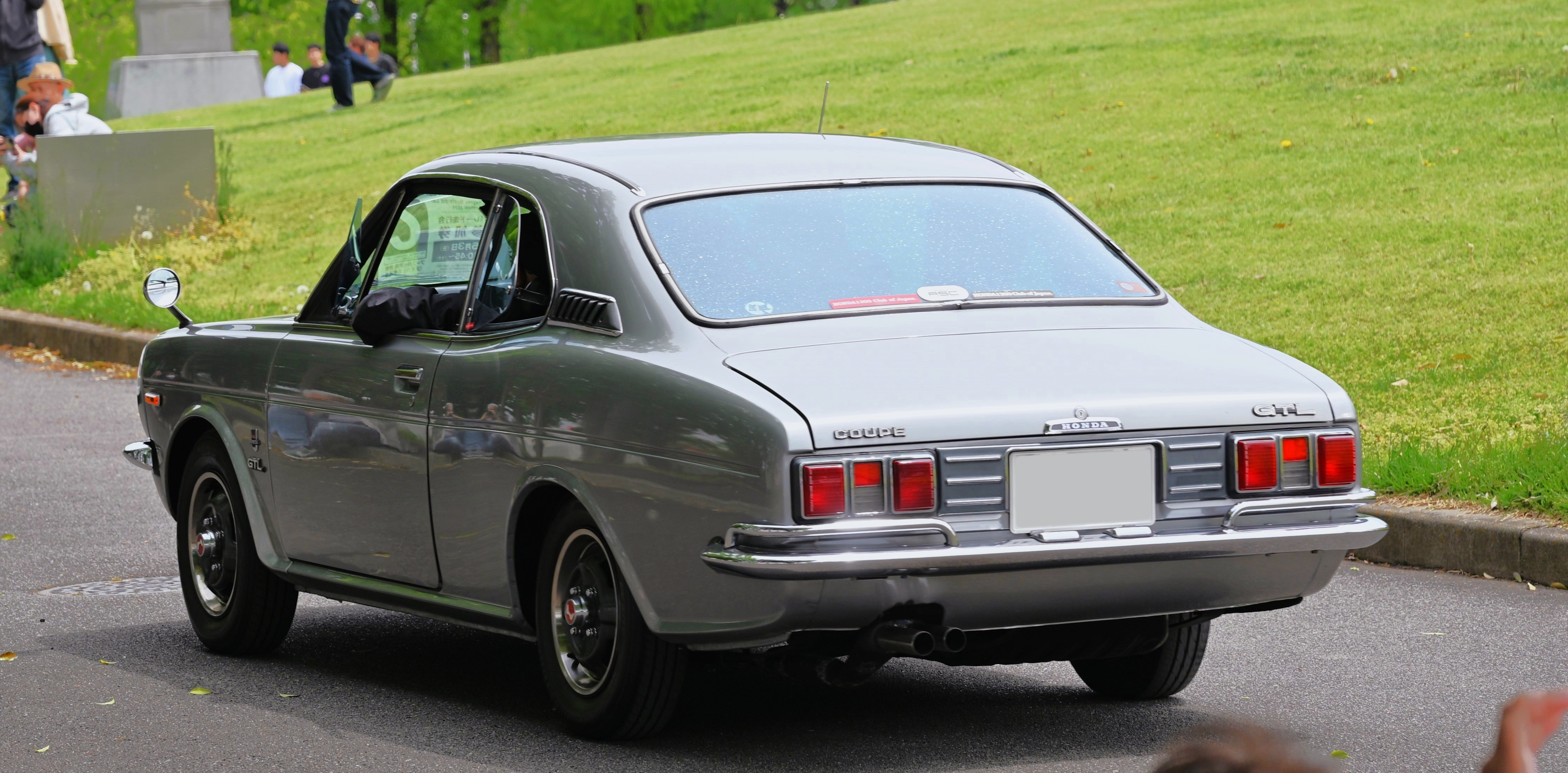
1971–1972 Honda Coupe Dynamic Series GTL
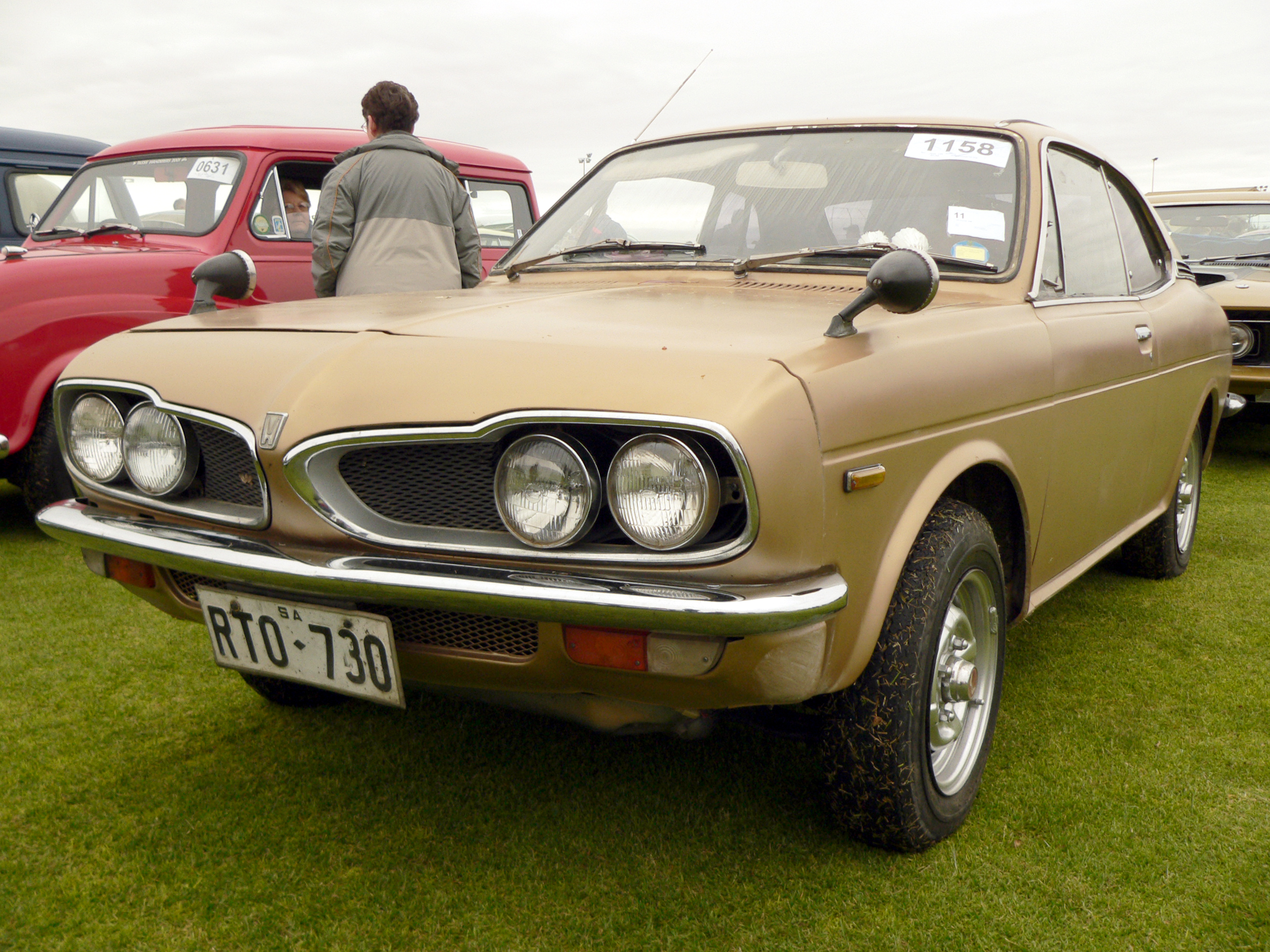

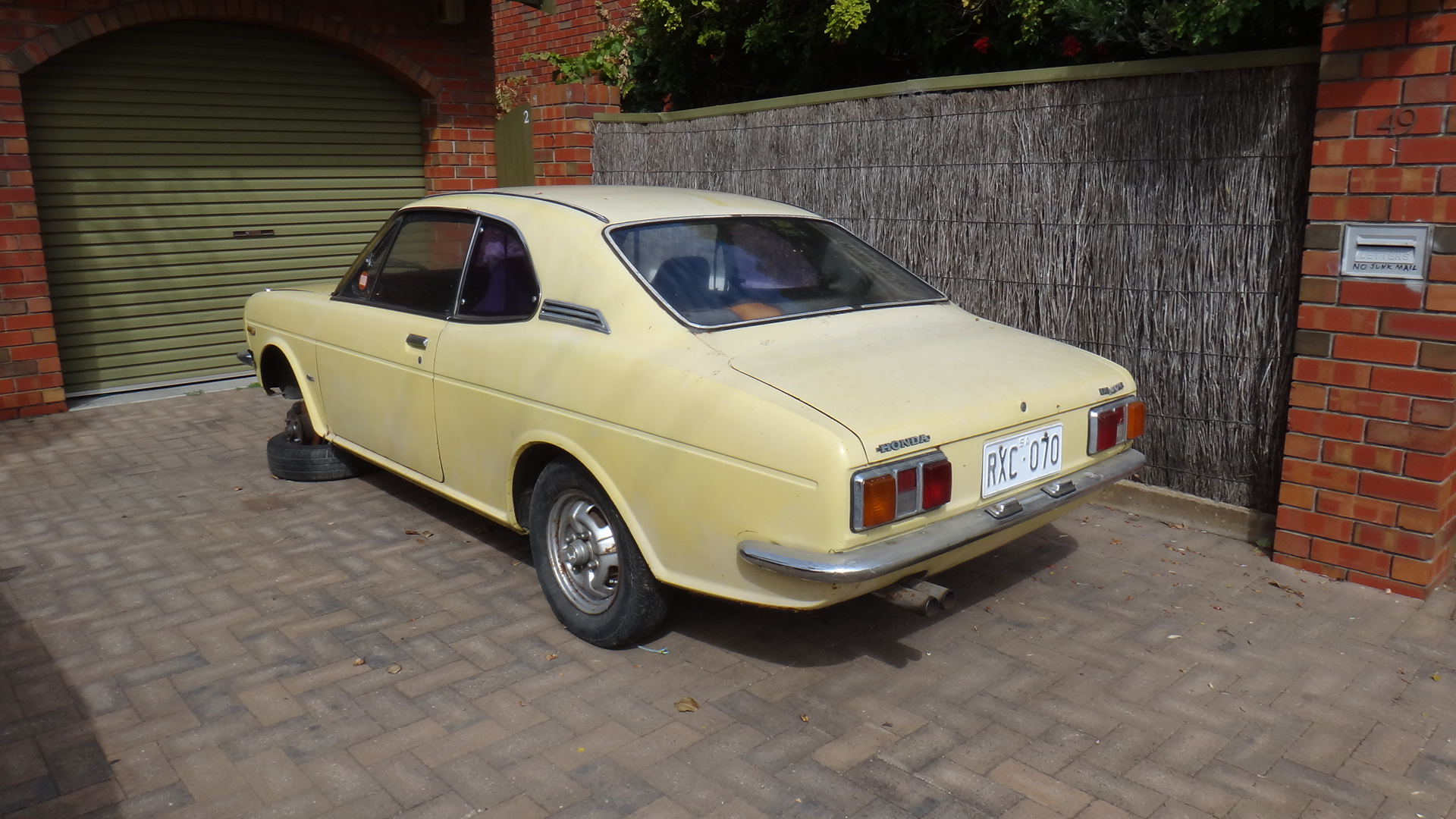
Australian market 1300 coupés, can be recognized by the additional cornering lights and rear amber turn signals.

Despite enthusiastic imprecations from Honda's US dealers, the Honda 1300 was not sold in the US. Nor is there evidence of any sustained effort to sell it into Europe. All Honda 1300 built were RHD. In European terms, the car's engine size and dimensions would have placed it in the competitive sector of small 1300 cc family sedans, although its 57-inch (1,400 mm) width, reported to have been selected in order to qualify for the lower tax class on the domestic (Japanese) market, was significantly below the European standard represented by cars such as the Ford Escort of the time. The 1.3 litre engine displacement also gave Japanese buyers tax savings when the annual road tax was due over competitors with larger engines. Surviving examples outside Japan appear mostly to be located in countries bordering the Pacific Ocean. According to Australian Bureau of Statistics, 731 unit of 1300 coupés were sold in Australia from 1969 to 1973.

== Engine ==
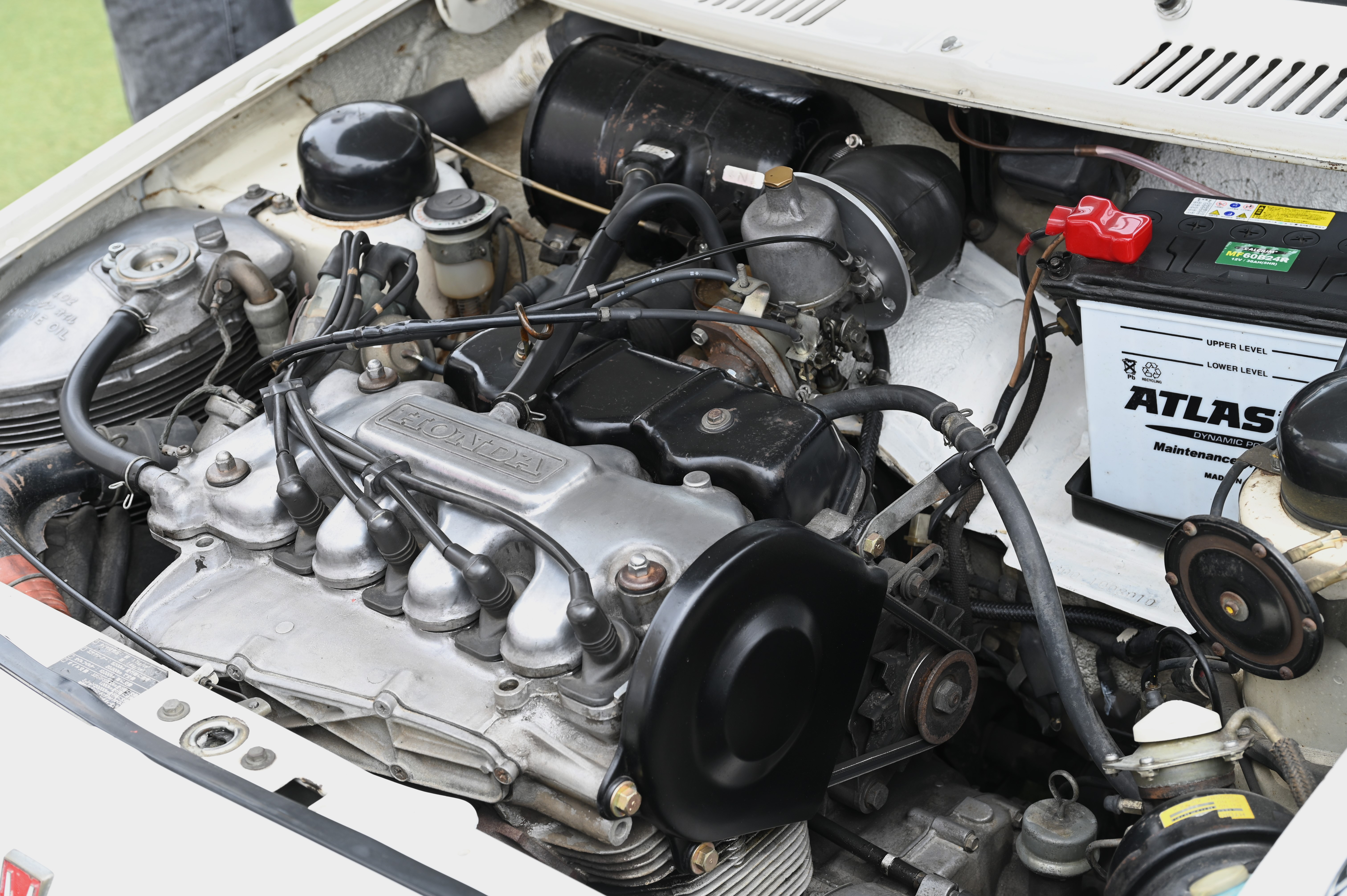
H1300E engine

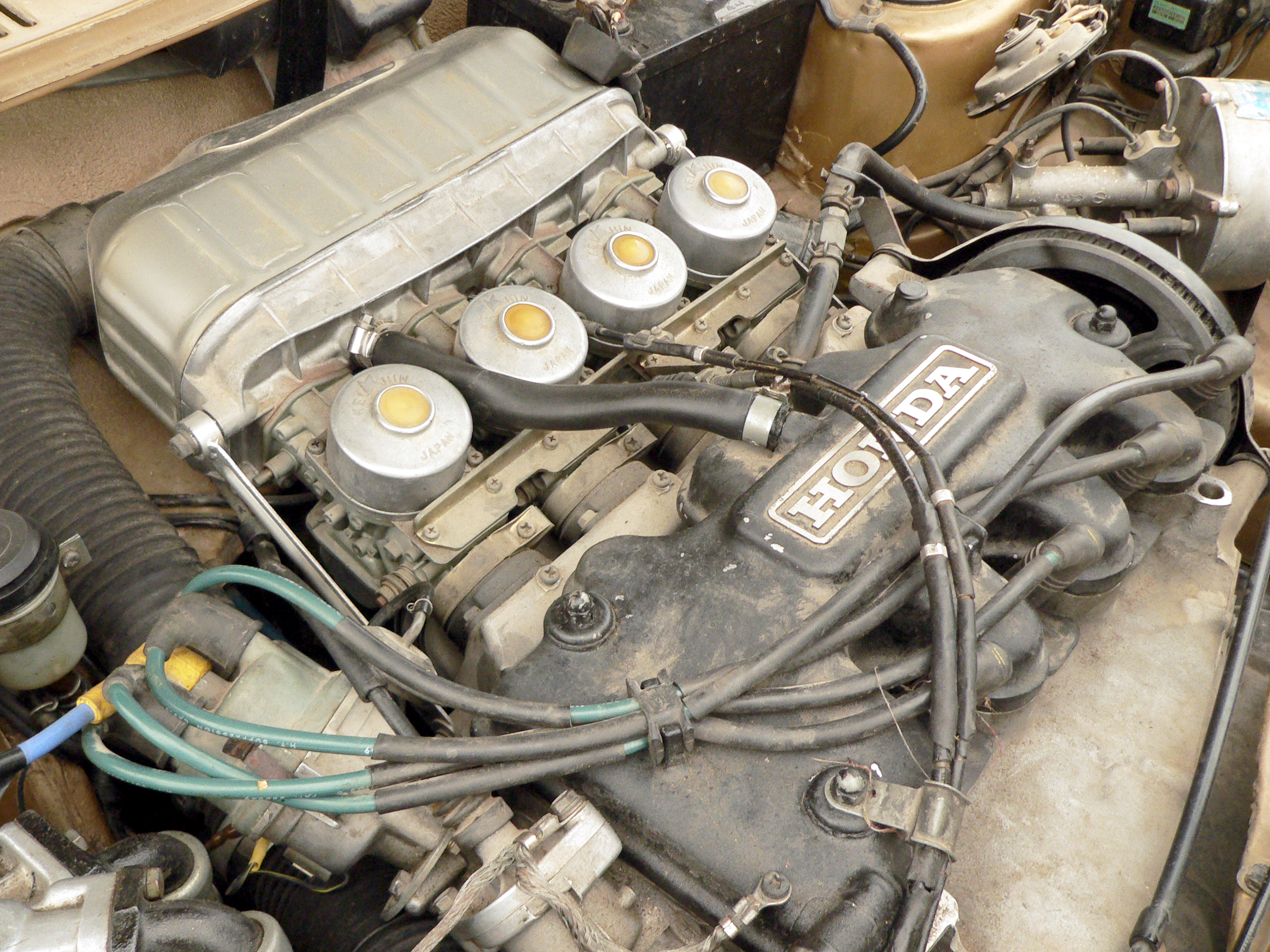
H1300E engine with four carburetors

The engine was SOHC and air-cooled, with a fan attached to the flywheel to pull cool air through the engine block. Honda labeled this Duo Dyna Air Cooling (DDAC). The air that had absorbed heat from the engine block, and additional hot air from around the exhaust manifold, was then used to heat the passenger compartment, a novel approach which was not commonly used afterward. Hideo Sugiura, then the head of the R&D Center, looked back upon the sentiment of the time:

"We had a powerful company founder, Mr. Honda, who was on top of the engineering operation. He also had expertise, which he had acquired through a string of enormous successes. Having such a leader, the sentiment in the company was that we had to see it all the way through, regardless of where the road might take us. There was to be no surrender. We could not give up halfway."

"Streamlining the bulky construction of the air-cooled engine, and giving it the quietness of a water-cooled engine, will create the ideal power plant...." With that concept in mind, the research engineers worked tirelessly to achieve their ideal. It was from this grueling process of trial and error that the DDAC integrated dual air-cooled engine was achieved. The initial prototype was completed in July 1968, after which dynamic performance testing, temperature measurements and other basic evaluations were conducted.

In a departure from the previous Honda practice of using roller bearings on the crankshaft, the 1300 engine had more conventional plain bearings. Two versions of the engine were available. The engine fitted to the 77 sedan and Coupé 7 had a single Keihin carburetor and developed 100 PS (74 kW; 99 hp), while the engine that powered the 99 sedan and Coupé 9 was equipped with four Keihin carburetors and developed 115 PS (85 kW; 113 hp) at 7,300 rpm.

Honda's power output claims for the car were initially met with skepticism among competitor manufacturers and in the trade press, but those who drove it reported an engine that would freely rev to an indicated 8,000 rpm, and remarkable performance for a 1,300 cc engined car: the factory figure at launch for a standing quarter-mile acceleration test of 17.2 seconds was felt to be not unreasonable. The engine was a dry-sump design with a pressurized oil system feeding from a tank. Its electrical fuel pump was another high-tech novelty which eventually became common. The electrical system was another matter—it had a separate redundant set of wiring on each side of the car.

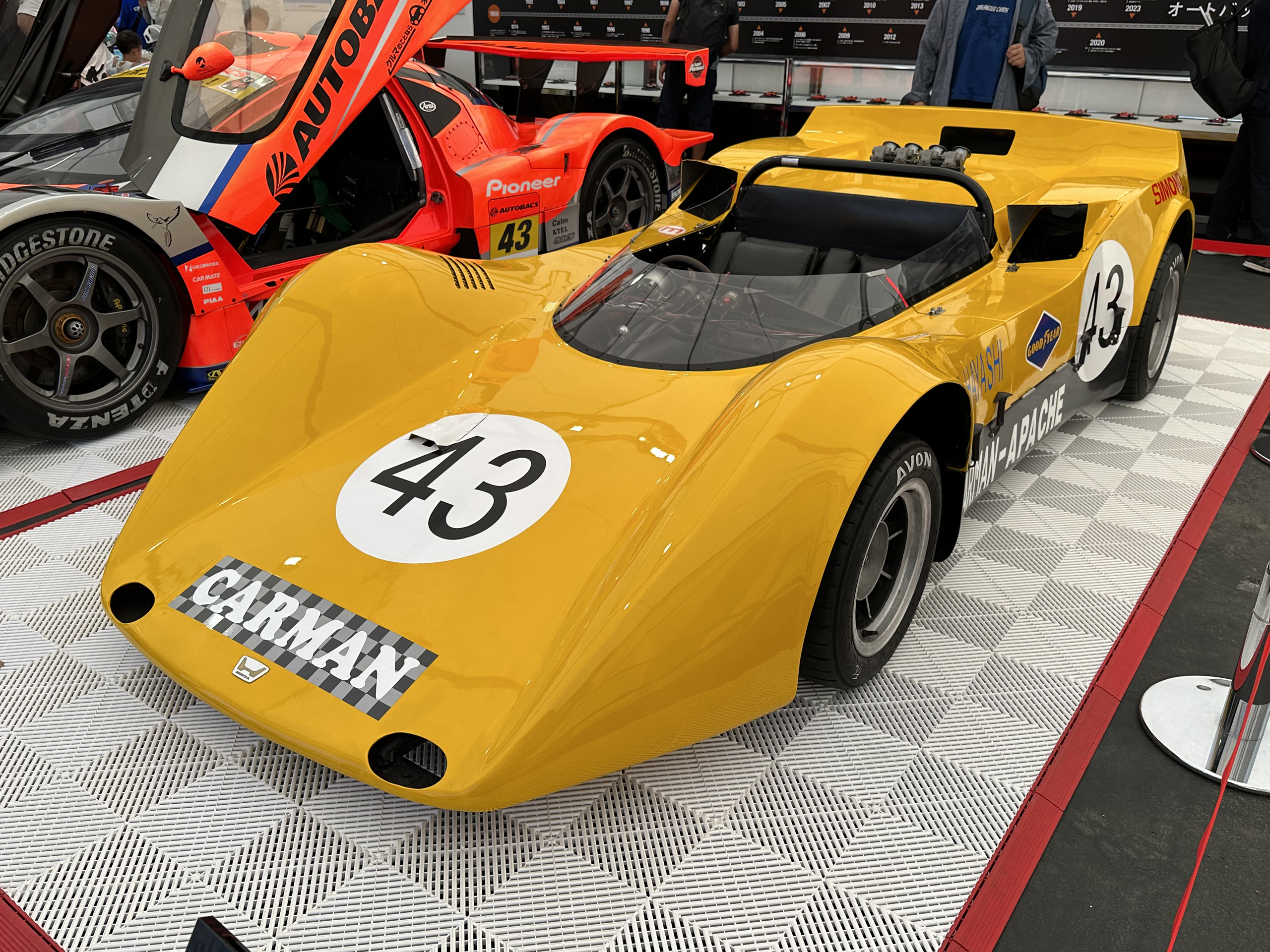

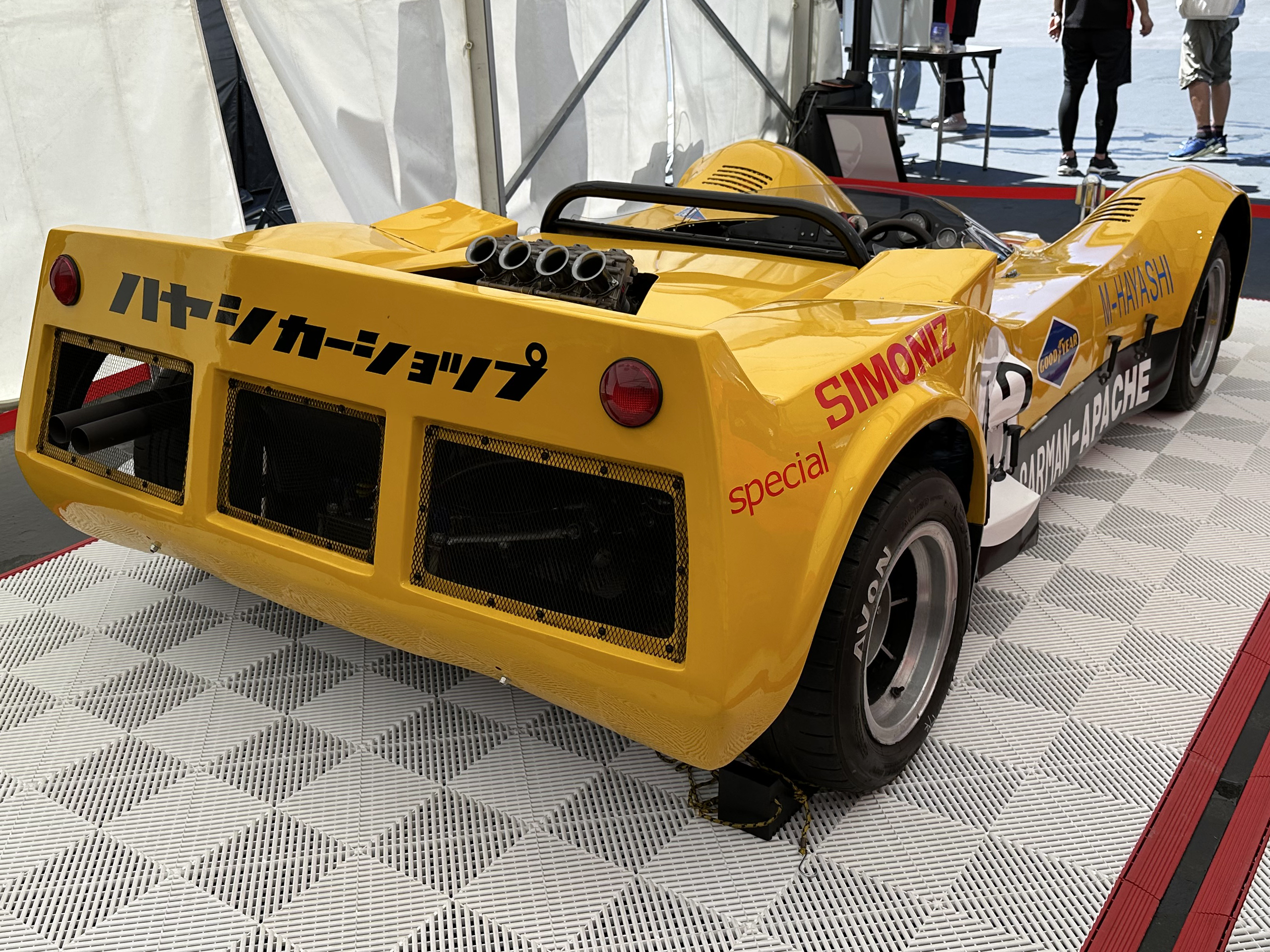
The 1969 Carman-Apache racing car

The high-revving character and dry-sump oil system both meant that the 1300s engine should be a natural for racing, and soon the RSC (Racing Service Club, Honda's competition department) built the mid-engined, tubular framed Honda R·1300. Next, in the 1969 Japan GP the similar Can-Am style Carman-Apache made its racing debut, with a Honda 1300 engine tuned to 135 PS (133 hp; 99 kW) at 7,000 rpm, mounted transversely in the middle. Weight was 490 kg (1,080 lb). The car made 29 laps (out of 120) before retiring, but continued to race with some modest success through the next year. The engine block was also used to create the 2991cc V8 used in the Honda RA302 that was raced at the Formula One racing car produced by Honda Racing, and introduced by Honda Racing France during the 1968 Formula One season. The car was built based on the order by Soichiro Honda to develop an air-cooled Formula One engine.

=== DDAC ===
Duo Dyna Air Cooling (Japanese: DDAC) was a feature of air-cooled engines presented by Honda in 1968. Its double-wall structure was the origin of its name.

DDAC took the concept of the "water jacket" used in liquid-cooled engines and applied it to an air-cooled engine; the outer wall of the cylinder block is part of the structure in a two-casting mold, and the cooling air passes through the space where coolant would flow in a water-cooled engine. The cooling system used two fans: one to force cool air into the passages, the other to direct the heated air away from the engine. The engine was all aluminum, but this design increased engine weight compared to the usual air-cooled design – while benefiting from cross flow cooling.

== Running gear ==
The car employed rack and pinion steering. At the front it had disc brakes, with drum brakes controlled via a dual-line hydraulic system at the rear. Suspension was independent, employing MacPherson struts at the front and an unusual combination of full-width swing axles and half-elliptic leaf springs at the rear. The front suspension was substantially modified after the car's initial presentation: production cars incorporated modified front suspension geometry, a lowered steering ratio and a steering damper, intended to reduce the unusually strong self-centring propensity which was a feature of the pre-production cars originally presented to journalists. The cars as sold also incorporated an updated gear-box and final drive ratios along with re-sized wheels.

== Legacy ==
The experience of developing and producing the 1300 provided the shock needed to change Honda's operating structure. Under the new system, Honda introduced the water-cooled Life and Civic models as its new mini automobile and small passenger cars. The Civic, which was equipped with a CVCC engine in full compliance with the Japanese government's Air Pollution Control Act, drew the world's attention to Honda's engineering approach.

Those involved in the 1300 project agreed unanimously: the pain they endured in completing it contributed much to the development of Honda's subsequent successful automobile models.

== Honda 145 ==
Honda 145
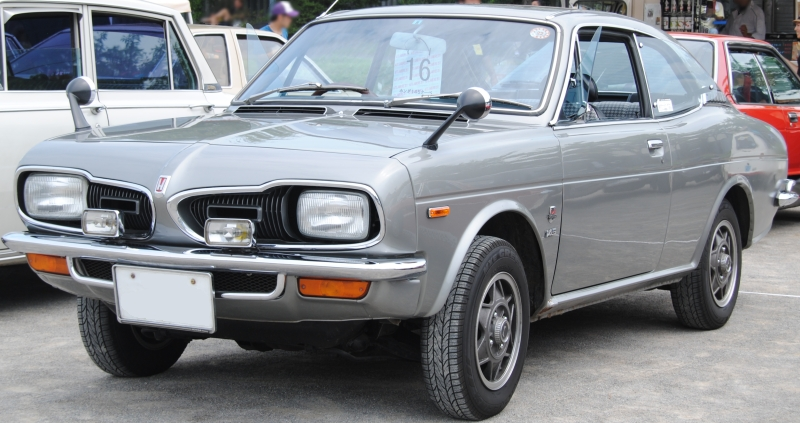
- 1972–1974 Honda 145 GL coupé

Overview
- Manufacturer: Honda
- Also called: Honda H145
- Production: 1972–1974
- Assembly: Suzuka Plant, Suzuka, Mie, Japan

Body and chassis
- Class: Compact car
- Body style: 2-door coupé; 4-door sedan
- Layout: Front-engine, front-wheel-drive

Powertrain
- Engine: 1433 cc EB5 water-cooled I4
- Transmission: 4-speed manual; 2-speed Hondamatic semi-automatic

Dimensions
- Wheelbase: 2,250 mm (88.6 in)
- Length: 3,995–4,020 mm (157.3–158.3 in) (sedan); 4,120 mm (162.2 in) (coupé)
- Width: 1,465 mm (57.7 in) (sedan); 1,495 mm (58.9 in) (coupé)
- Height: 1,330 mm (52 in) (coupé); 1,360 mm (54 in) (sedan)
- Curb weight: 845–880 kg (1,863–1,940 lb) (sedan); 850–880 kg (1,874–1,940 lb) (coupé)

Chronology
- Predecessor: Honda 1300
- Successor: Honda Accord (sedan); Honda Prelude (coupe)

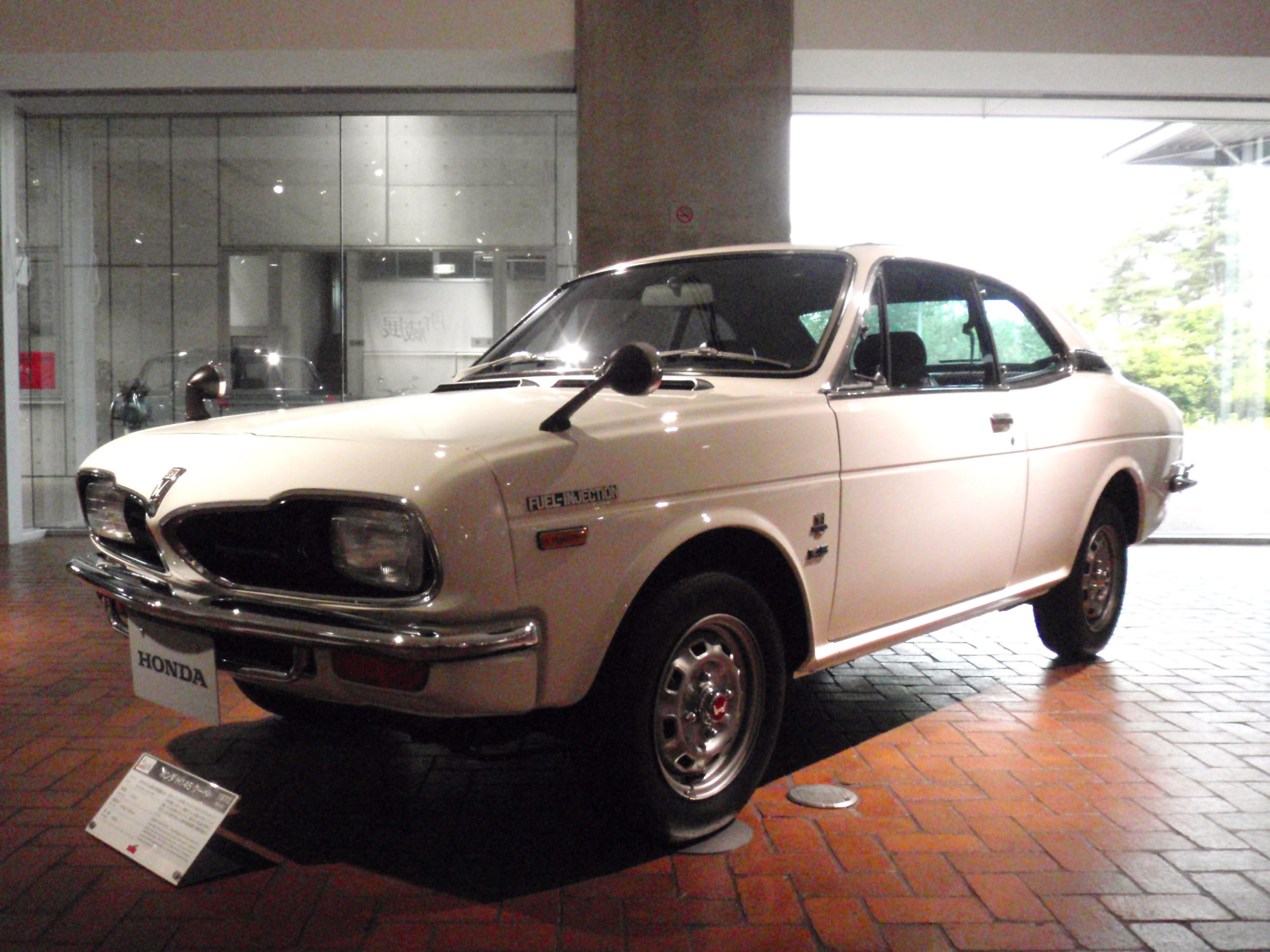
145 FI coupé, the only model with fuel injected engine

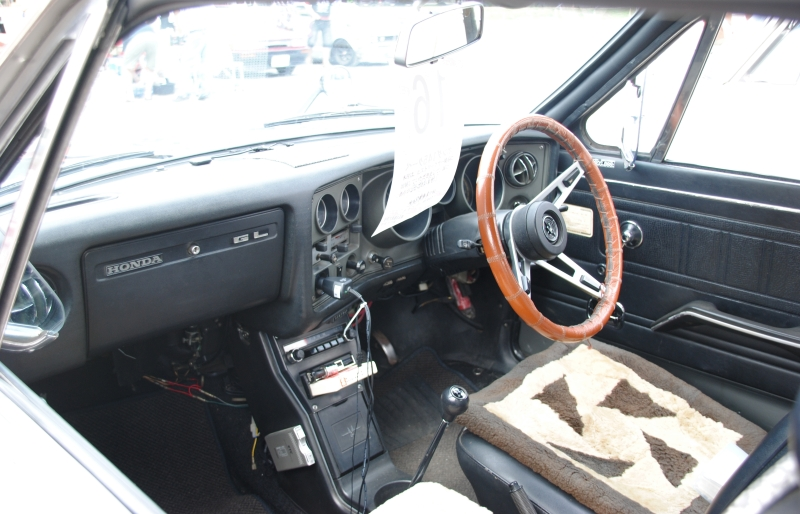
Interior

In October 1972, the 1300 was facelifted again and also rebranded as Honda 145, again offered as a sedan or a coupé. The 145's body was little changed from the 1300, but it was powered by a SOHC water-cooled 1,433 cc EB5 engine with carburetor (80 PS (59 kW; 79 hp)) or fuel injection (90 PS (66 kW; 89 hp), coupé only). The engine is mated to a 4-speed manual transmission and a 2-speed Hondamatic semi-automatic transmission. The car's engine displacement was the inspiration for its name. The market was not impressed by the 145; only 9,736 were produced, and the model was quickly overshadowed by the introduction of Honda's own Civic 4 months earlier. The 145 ended production in October 1974 and the sedan was succeeded by Accord. After the 145, Honda did not produce a coupé again until 1978, when the Prelude was introduced.
