= Fiat 124 Sport Coupé =

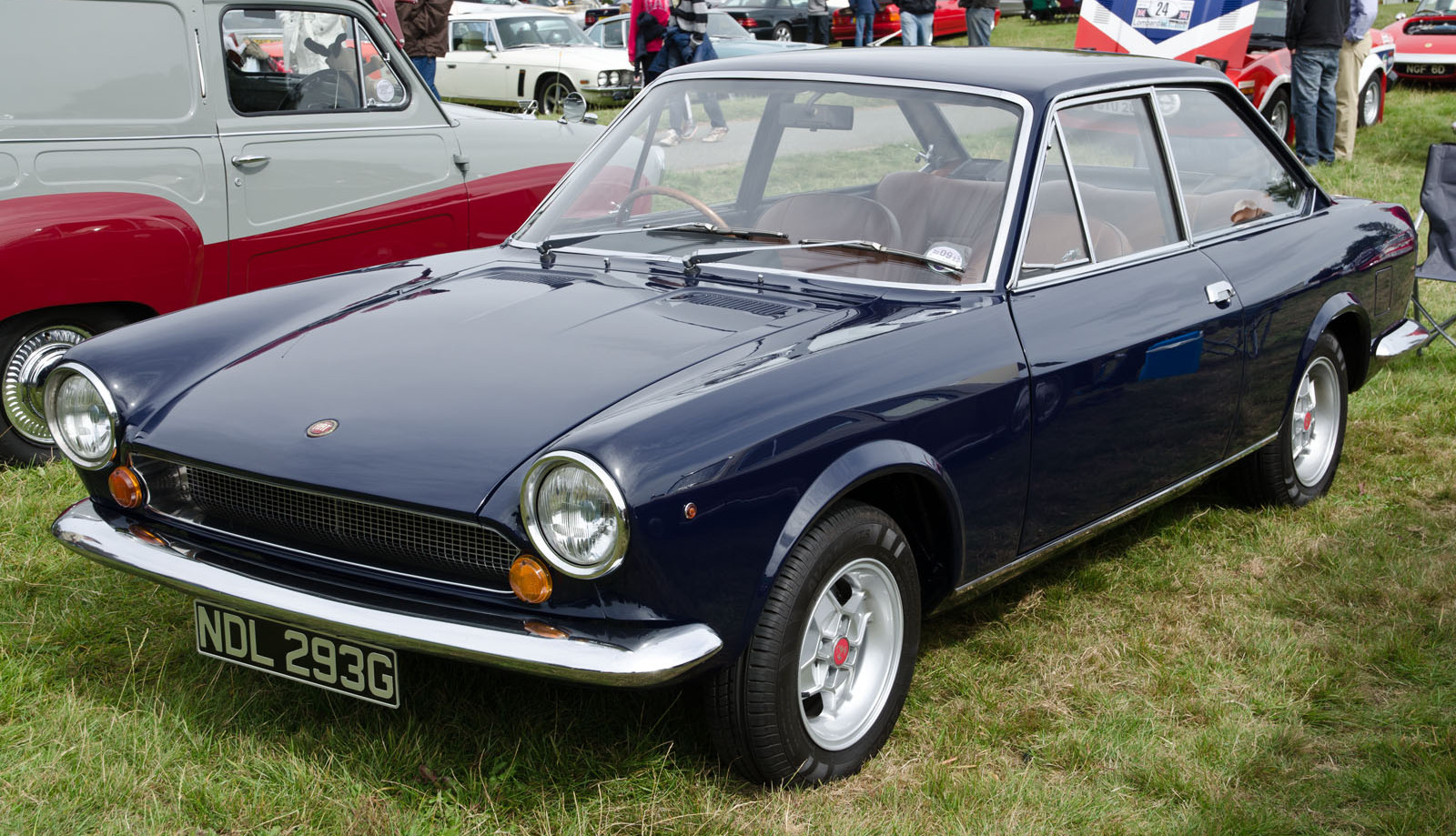
- 1969 Fiat 124 Coupé 1400 (series 1)

Overview
- Manufacturer: Fiat
- Also called: SEAT 124 Sport
- Production: 1967–1975
- Designer: Felice Mario Boano at Centro Stile Fiat

Body and chassis
- Class: Sports car (S)
- Body style: 2-door notchback coupé
- Layout: Front-engine, rear-wheel-drive

Powertrain
- Engine: 1,438 cc I4 (AC/BC); 1,608 cc I4 (BC); 1,592 cc I4 (CC); 1,756 cc I4 (CC)
- Transmission: 4-speed manual (1967–1968); 5-speed manual (1967–1975)

Dimensions
- Wheelbase: 2,420 mm (95.3 in)
- Length: 4,115 mm (162.0 in) AC; 4,120 mm (162.2 in) BC; 4,242–4,343 mm (167–171 in) CC
- Width: 1,670 mm (65.7 in)
- Height: 1,340 mm (52.8 in)
- Kerb weight: 960 kg (2,116 lb) AC; 1,004 kg (2,214 lb) BC; 1,000–1,070 kg (2,205–2,360 lb) CC

Chronology
- Predecessor: Fiat 1500/1600 Coupé

The Fiat 124 Sport Coupé is a two-door, four-seater notchback coupé produced by the Italian automaker Fiat in three generations between 1967 and 1975. First shown at the 1966 Turin Auto Show, it was based on the Fiat 124 saloon.

Its four-cylinder aluminum and iron, twin overhead cam "Lampredi engine" was designed by ex-Ferrari engineer Aurelio Lampredi. Originally, the AC, or first generation, featured a 1,438 cc engine, which was joined by a 1,608 cc unit in the second, or BC, generation. The third generation, or CC, was first officially offered with the 1,592 cc and later the 1,756 cc engine (although some early CCs were fitted with leftover 1,608 cc engines).

Equipment included a five-speed gearbox (although very early AC models featured a four-speed), four wheel power disc brakes, double wishbone front suspension, one carburetor per cylinder (two dual-choke Weber or Solex carburetors on the BC series, 1608 cc engine — except for the US version which received mild carburation due to emissions constraints), electric fuel pump (on the CC series), and suspension by coil springs.

The Fiat 124 Sport Coupé was also built under license in Spain with 1600 (FC-00) and 1800 (FC-02) engines as the SEAT 124 Sport.

== Design ==
The 124 Sport Coupé was designed as a three-box, 2-door notchback coupé by Mario Boano, known for styling the bodywork on the Ferrari 250 GT "Boano". As many parts as possible were used from the 1966 FIAT 124 Berlina saloon. Boano was hired by FIAT and made responsible for the in-house Centro Stile Fiat, while the iconic softtop Fiat 124 Sport Spider, which also shared the same basic platform as the 124 Sedan but rode on a 14 cm shorter wheelbase, was outsourced to famed Italian carrozzeria Pininfarina.

Approximately 113,000 AC Coupés, 98,000 BC Coupés, and roughly 75,000 CC Coupés were manufactured. All models changed over time, making them almost unique to each year (e.g., the lack of a rear anti-roll bar on 1969 ACs).

The Fiat 124 Spider Abarth came with dual Weber 44 IDF carburetors, unlike the regular 124 coupés and spiders, which had dual Weber 40 IDF carbs. Fiat twincam engines tend to be oversquare, with a larger bore diameter than stroke length, allowing them, when combined with dual camshafts and proper carburetors, to rev to high RPMs. The 1608 cc, however, is a perfectly square engine, 80 mm by 80 mm.

=== Engines ===
- 1400 (1438 cc) - 90 PS (66 kW; 89 hp) at 6,500 rpm, 11 kg⋅m (108 N⋅m; 80 lb⋅ft) at 3,600 rpm
- 1600 (1608 cc) - 110 PS (81 kW; 108 hp) at 6,400 rpm, 14 kg⋅m (137 N⋅m; 101 lb⋅ft) at 3,800 rpm
- 1600 (1592 cc) - 108 PS (79 kW; 107 hp)
- 1800 (1756 cc) - 118 PS (87 kW; 116 hp)

== History ==
=== First series (Type 124 AC: 1967–1969) ===
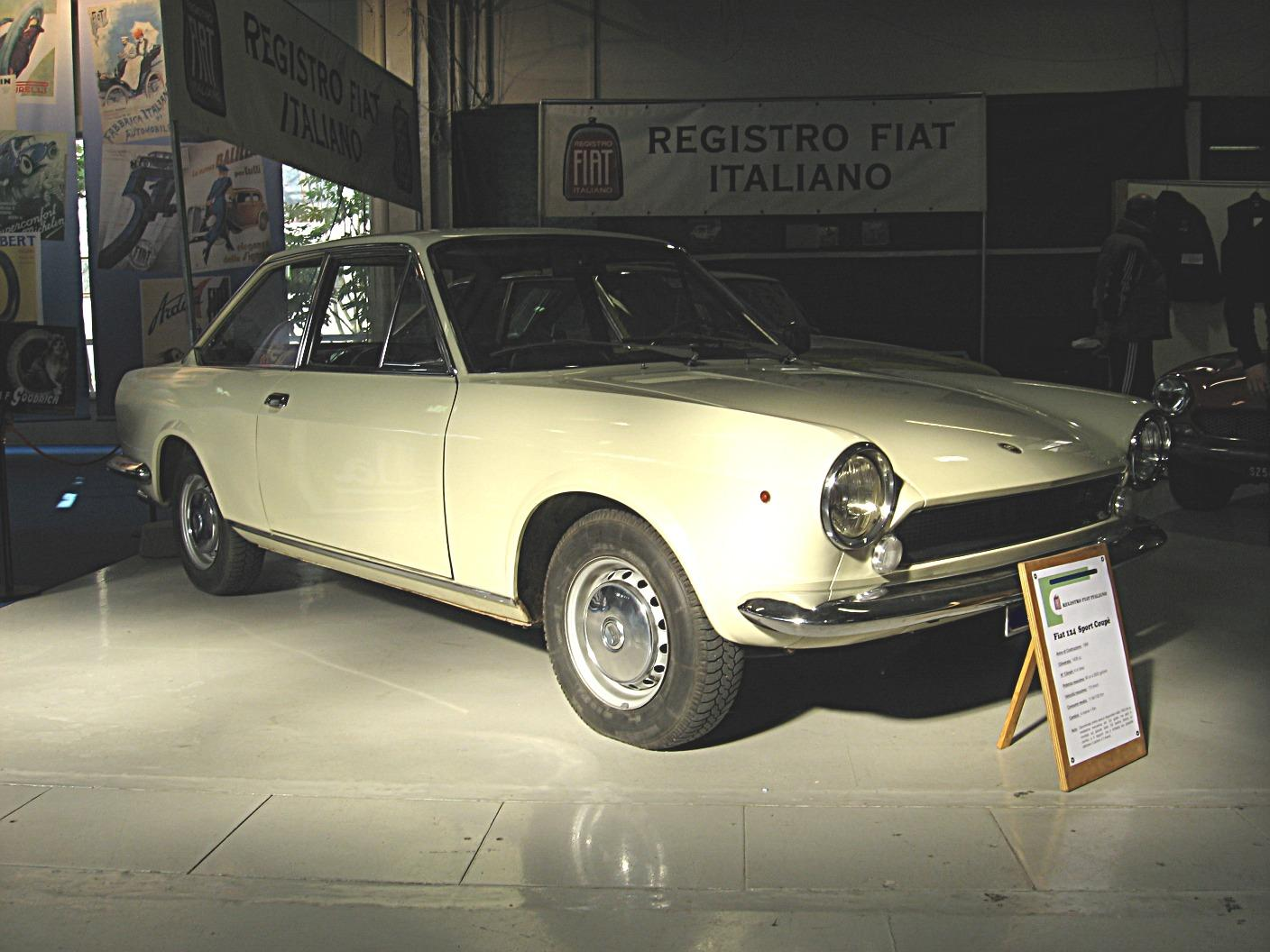
Fiat 124 Sport Coupé AC

- 1967 AC - starts 000001 - #034513
- 1968 AC - #034514 - #066279
- 1969 AC - #066280 - #113869

The AC model began in 1967 and came with a 1438 cc twin cam, 4-speed gearbox (with the option of a 5-speed item appearing in mid-1967), front and rear anti-roll bars, and a torque tube rear axle. It featured a 200 km/h (124 mph) speedometer, three supplementary gauges, a faux-wood steering wheel, a woodgrain dash and console top. The 124 Sport Coupé's tail lights were also used on the Lamborghini Espada and Iso Rivolta.

124 Sport Coupés were modern in chassis and engine design. Braking was via four 230 mm disc brakes with a front/rear weight-sensitive proportioning valve. It also had a sealed cooling system, viscous fan clutch, and a toothed timing belt for the twin-cam engine, the first mass-produced engine to feature this instead of the usual chain drive.

Fiat replaced the A series' torque-tube rear axle with a four-link rear axle with a Panhard rod in mid-1968, and it remained the same throughout the B and C models.

=== Second series (Type 124 BC: 1969–1972) ===
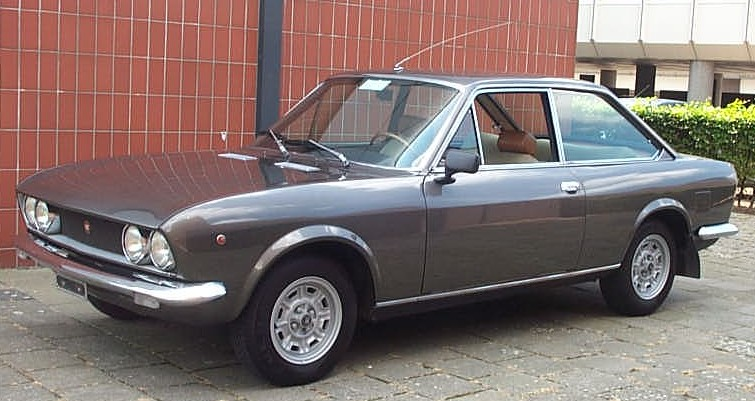
Fiat 124 Sport Coupé 1600 BC 1969

- 1970 BC - #113870 - #115876
- 1971 BC 1438 cc - #115877 - #139912
- 1971 BC1 1608 cc - #139913
- 1972 BC1 1608 cc - #181442

The BC featured revised styling with twin headlights and revised taillights; the taillights were also used on the Lamborghini Jarama. The 124 BC, including the 1600 model, was first shown at the 1969 Turin Auto Show.

The BC was available with both the 1438 cc and the new 1608 cc engine. In the United States, initially only the 1400 was offered. Other details remained similar to the AC, except the interior dash now had a 220 km/h (137 mph) speedometer, 9000 rpm tachometer in 1608 cc models, and a clock. The steering wheel now had black painted spokes, and the seats had, for the first time, cloth inserts in the centre. There was no woodgrain inside like before (all the panels were finished in black vinyl and the gauge rims were matt black) and "eyeball" vents were fitted in the centre console where the AC had a decorative panel simply filling the space for an optional radio.

Options included green tinted windows, Cromodora alloy wheels with chrome centre hub cap, radio, seat headrests, rear windshield electric defrosting, electronic ignition. At the end of the BC run, air conditioning became available as an option as well. The fuel tanks were always around 46 litres (12 US gal; 10 imp gal).

=== Third series (Type 124 CC: 1972–1975) ===
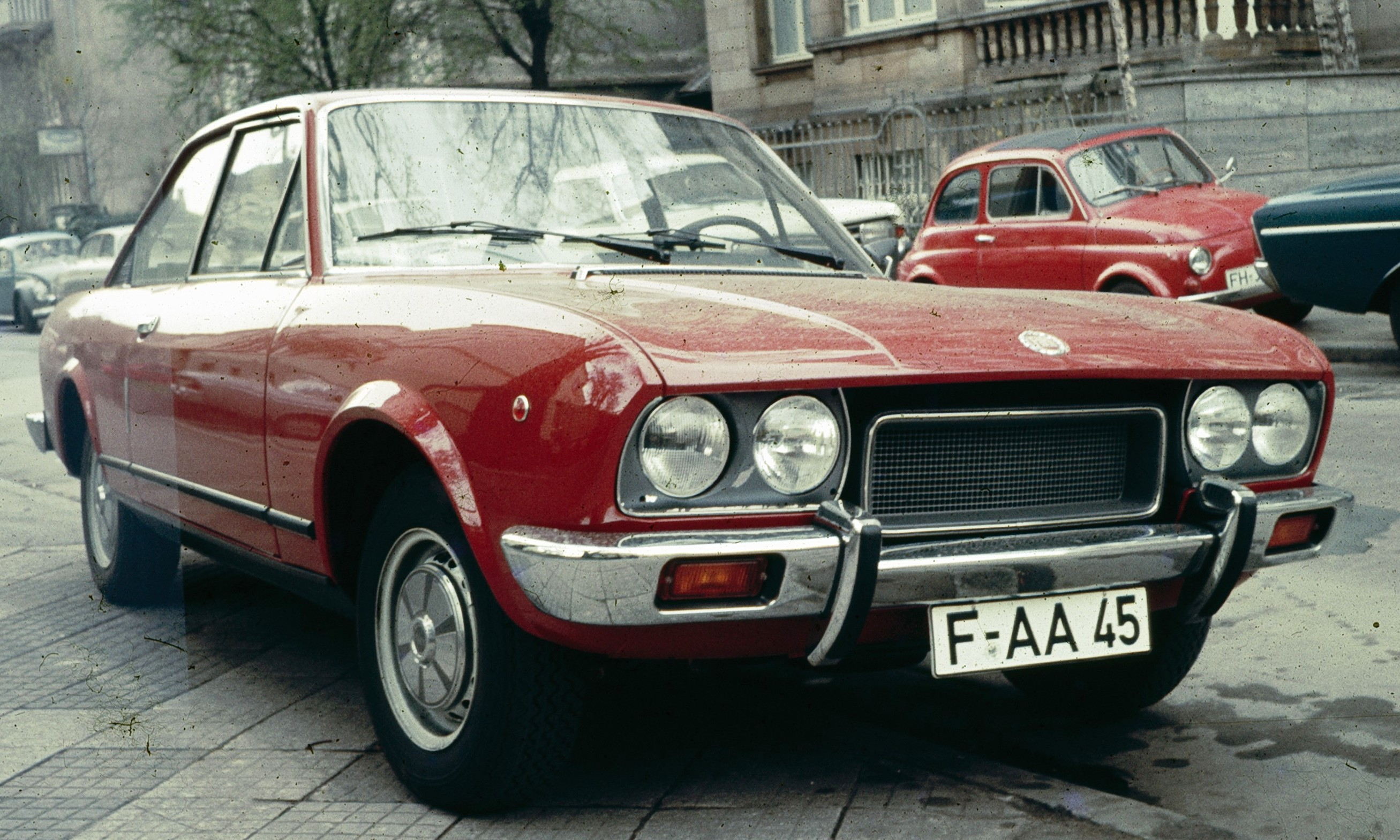
Fiat 124 Sport Coupé CC

- 1973 CC 1608 cc - #206905
- 1973 CC 1592 cc - #213370
- 1974 CC1 1756 cc - #240100
- 1975 CC1 1756 cc - #269934

The third series 124 Coupé (type CC) arrived in 1973 with new front styling and a revised squarer rear tail with a new deeper trunklid. Taillights also changed to a now vertical arrangement and side rear windows were revised.

The CC started with a small batch fitted with the 1608 cc engine, soon changing to a revised 1592 cc engine (slightly shorter stroke at 79,2 mm to create a "sub-1600" engine to fit the lower tax bracket in Italy) and an enlarged 84 mm bore creating an engine of 1756 cc. The 1592 cc and 1756 cc (sourced from the new Fiat 132, introduced in 1972) both made use of a single carburetor again (the Weber 34 DMS). In spite of this change the 1756 cc was the most powerful engine produced with 118 PS (87 kW) and a top speed of 185 km/h (115 mph).

In the United States, tightening emissions regulations meant less power: the 1592-cc engine produced 87 hp (65 kW; 88 PS), while the larger 1800 which replaced it for the 1974 model year had 92.5 hp (69 kW; 94 PS) at 5,500 rpm on tap. This engine also suffered severe drivability problems thanks to the emissions hardware. For 1974, the US model was also saddled with very large and heavy safety bumpers, increasing weight by 45 kg (100 lb) over the 1973. The 1974 US-market 124 Sport Coupé weighed 1,069 kg (2,356 lb), while overall length was up to 169.8 in (4,313 mm).

The CC's revised interior featured a new dashboard incorporating a lower panel on the passenger side, an alloy fascia in front of the driver and seats covered completely in cloth. There was a new vinyl-covered steering wheel rim with anodised silver spokes. The optional but not uncommon Cromodora wheels now had a revised design with no chrome centre hubcap, instead having exposed wheelnuts. These were of an 8 slot design, the earlier wheels used coming in 6 slot configuration (an 8-slot design was also current but not original to the 124 range).

== License Production ==
=== SEAT 124 Sport ===
The car was also built under license in Spain as the SEAT 124 Sport between 1970 and 1974. SEAT built a total of 23,611 units of the 124 Sport.

The SEAT derivative was presented for the first time at the 1970 Barcelona Motor Show and it was built in Spain under license from Fiat. Identical to the Fiat 124 Sport Coupé second (1600) and third series (1800), it was launched in order to meet the rising local market demand for sports cars at the time.

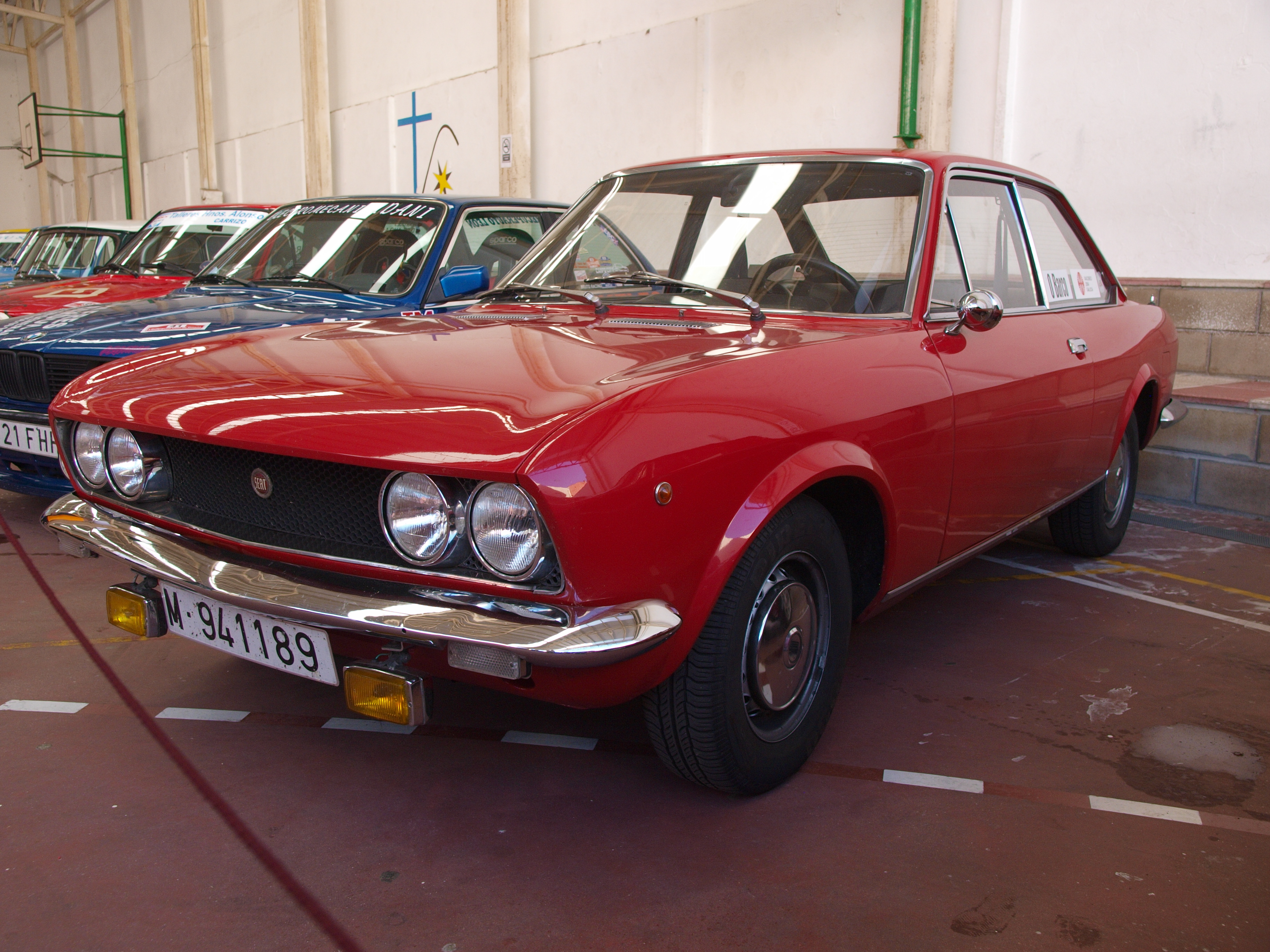
Seat 124 Sport SC 1600

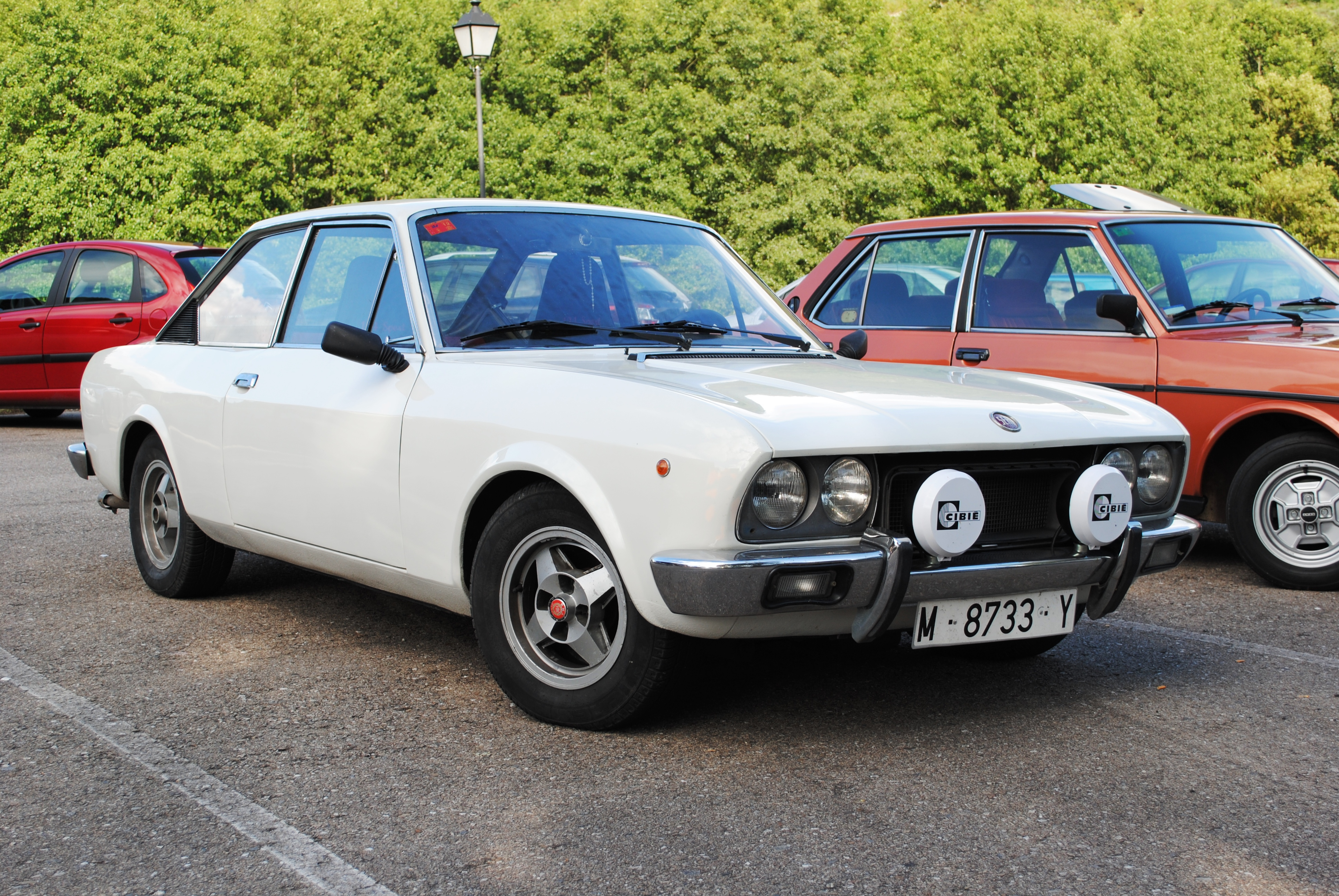
SEAT 124 Sport 1800
