= Group E Series Production Touring Cars =

Australian motor racing category

Group E Series Production Touring Cars was an Australian motor racing category for production based sedans competing with limited modifications. It was current from 1964 to 1972.

Although production car racing in Australia had gained momentum with the running of the first Armstrong 500 endurance race at Phillip Island in 1960, no national guidelines for this type of racing existed until 1 January 1964 when the Group E regulations were introduced by the Confederation of Australian Motor Sport as part of a major review of Australian motor sport categories. Vehicles racing in Group E had to be one of at least 1000 units which had been produced in 12 months and could compete only with strictly limited modifications. The rules were framed to cater for cars such as those that had been contesting the Armstrong 500 (which had moved from Phillip Island to the Mount Panorama Circuit at Bathurst in 1963), although that race continued to run under its own regulations which at the time limited the field to Australian built cars only. From 1967 the minimum production requirement for Group E was changed to 5000 units produced internationally or 500 produced and/or sold in Australia.

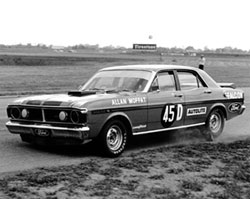
A Group E Ford Falcon GTHO Phase III at Surfers Paradise International Raceway in February 1972

In 1969 Group E cars were eligible to compete in the Australian Touring Car Championship alongside the more highly modified Group C Improved Production Touring Cars for the first time. The local market component of the eligibility rules for Group E was relaxed in 1970 such that models of which 200 units had been sold in Australia within 12 months were now eligible. The annual Hardie Ferodo 500 endurance race at Bathurst continued to be run under regulations differing from Group E, with the former still being more restrictive in terms of permitted modifications. For 1971 CAMS introduced the Australian Manufacturers' Championship title which was to be contested over a series of endurance races for Group E cars and the Hardie Ferodo 500 was included in this series for the first time in 1972. By this time the eligibility rules had been changed again with a vehicle now accepted if it was one of 200 manufactured or assembled in Australia or if it was a recognised FIA Group 1 Touring Car of which at least 100 units had been sold in Australia.

In 1973, in response to the growing media concerns regarding Group E homologation specials, CAMS replaced both Group E and Group C with a new Group C Touring Car category which specified a level of modifications between those applicable in the two superseded classes. The Australian Touring Car Championship, Australian Manufacturers' Championship and the Bathurst endurance race would all be run to the new Group C rules from that year.

Production car racing in Australia was revived in 1981 when CAMS introduced regulations for "Group E Series Production Cars", officially redesignated to its current "Group 3E Series Production Cars" name in 1988.
