= 1967 Gallaher 500 =

Motor race in Australia

Seasons
- ← 1966 1968 →

Layout of the Mount Panorama Circuit (1938-1986)

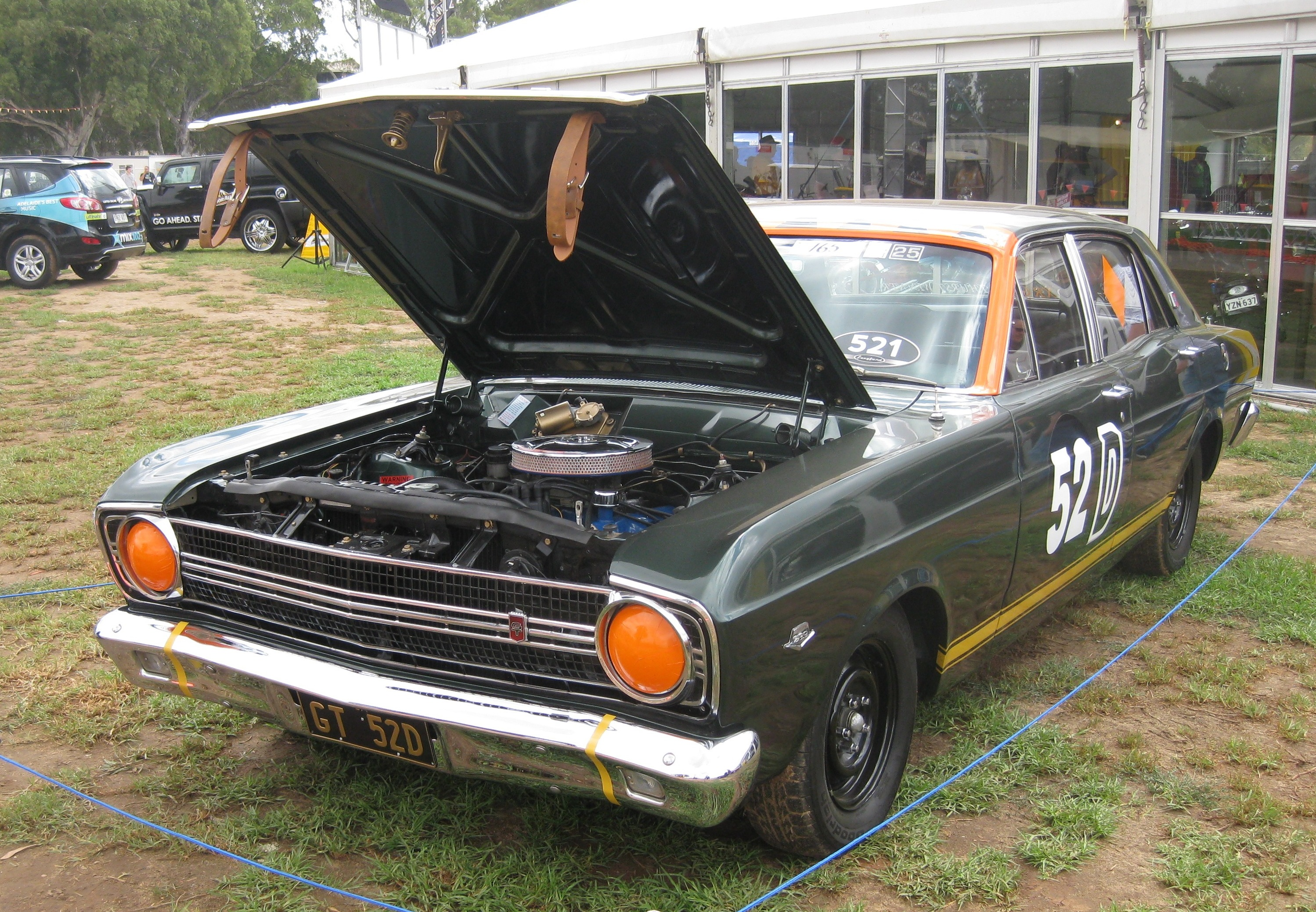
A "race replica" of the winning Ford XR Falcon GT of Harry Firth and Fred Gibson

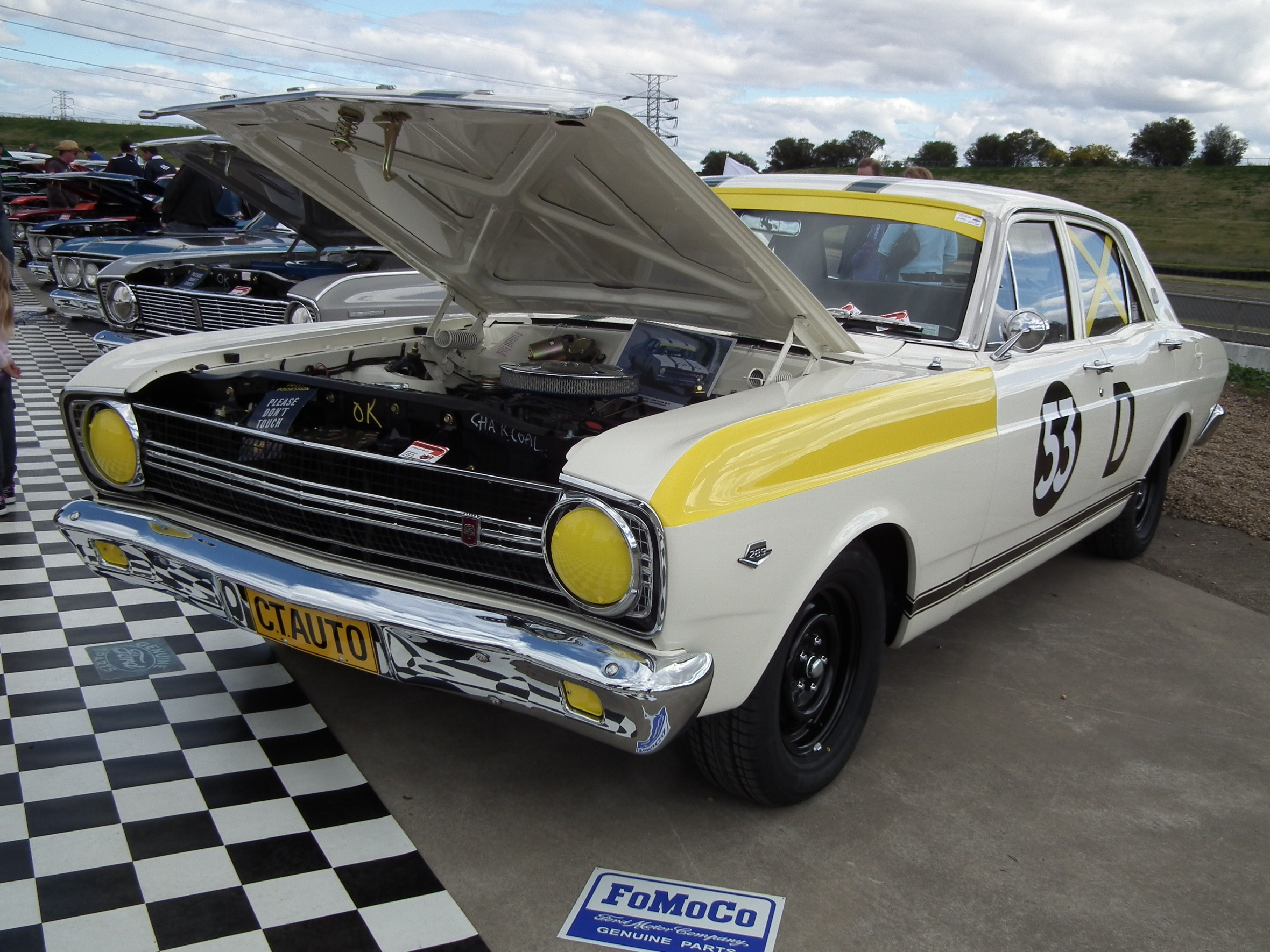
A "race replica" of the second placed Ford XR Falcon GT of Ian Geoghegan and Leo Geoghegan

The 1967 Gallaher 500 was a motor race for Production Saloon Cars held at the Mount Panorama Circuit just outside Bathurst in New South Wales, Australia on 1 October 1967. The race, which was the eighth running of the Bathurst 500, was organised by the Australian Racing Drivers Club Ltd and promoted by Gallaher International (Aust) Ltd.

Each competing car was required to be a production saloon competing in standard specification as laid down in the manufacturer's standard workshop manual. Optional extras and open exhausts were not permitted. To be eligible to compete, a car had to be an Australian built or assembled model of which 200 examples had been registered in Australia by 30 September 1967, or a fully imported model of which 100 examples had been registered in Australia by the same date.

In a seminal moment for the race, the first Australian-built V8-powered Ford Falcons competed in the form of seven Falcon GTs and a Falcon automatic. In a race long duel against three Alfa Romeo 1600 GTVs, two entered by Alec Mildren Racing and one by M.W. Motors, the Ford Motor Company-entered Falcon GTs achieved a one-two finish with Harry Firth and Fred Gibson acknowledged as race winners after confusion over lap-scoring briefly left uncertainty over the results. Brothers Leo and Ian Geoghegan finished second with the two Alec Mildren Racing Alfa Romeos of Doug Chivas / Max Stewart and Kevin Bartlett / Laurie Stewart all finishing on the same lap as the winning car. It was Firth's fourth Phillip Island 500/Bathurst 500 victory, equalling Bob Jane's record.

The confusion over the result stemmed from the Geoghegan brothers' first pit stop. Driving the opening stint, Leo Geoghegan's pole winning Falcon almost ran out of fuel coming past the pits. As he could not reverse into pit lane without being disqualified, Leo went in through the back gate to the pits located on Mountain Straight, and came back into pit lane through the paddock gate. Although he had not completed the lap, as he crossed the finish line in pit lane (located before he got to his pit bay) he was mistakenly credited with completing the lap. Firth, who knew this, was livid with the Australian Racing Drivers Club when the Geoghegan car was flagged in first, despite finishing 11 seconds behind Gibson (although he knew that he'd completed his 130th lap, Gibson completed another lap as he had not yet been shown the chequered flag). Firth, immediately protested the result and it was not until later that evening that he and Gibson were installed as race winners. Firth's protest led to long standing animosity between himself and the Geoghegan team who were teammates for the race, with Leo contending until his death in 2015 that he and his brother won the race.

== Class structure ==
Cars competed in five classes based on the purchase price of the vehicle in Australian dollars.

=== Class A ===
The lowest class was for under cars retailing for less $1,800. It comprised Datsun 1000 and 1300, Hillman GT, Holden Torana and Toyota Corolla.

=== Class B ===
The $1,801 to $2,100 class featured Ford Cortina, Hillman Arrow, and Morris Cooper and 1100S, Renault R8 and Toyota Corona.

=== Class C ===
The $2,101 to $3,000 class was dominated by the Morris Cooper S, but also contained Fiat 124 and 850, an automatic gearbox Ford Falcon, Holden HD X2 and Prince Skyline GT.

=== Class D ===
The $3,001 to $4,500 class featured the debut of the 'Australian V8's which would dominate the history of the race, represented by Ford Falcon GT, but also contained single entries of Alfa Romeo Giulia, Audi Super 90, Studebaker Lark, Triumph 2000 and Volvo 122.

=== Class E ===
For the first time an unlimited class, for cars over $4,500, was included and while many exotic cars were rumoured the class ultimately contained four Alfa Romeo 1600 GTVs and a single Dodge Phoenix TD2.

== Practice results ==
For 1967, race regulations were changed such that all grid positions were decided on practice times, regardless of class. Prior to this, the cars were gridded according to practice times but within their respective classes with the highest class starting at the front of the grid and so on.

The first ten places were as follows:

Pos.	No.	Entrant	Driver	Car	Qual.
1	53	Ford Motor Company	(Australia) Ian Geoghegan	Ford XR Falcon GT	3:03.0
2	52	Ford Motor Company	(Australia) Fred Gibson	Ford XR Falcon GT	3:03.2
3	61	Alec Mildren Racing Pty. Ltd.	(Australia) Kevin Bartlett	Alfa Romeo 1600 GTV	3:03.5
4	60	Alec Mildren Racing Pty. Ltd.	(Australia) Doug Chivas	Alfa Romeo 1600 GTV	3:05.2
5	54	Ford Motor Company	(Australia) Bob Jane	Ford XR Falcon GT	3:05.2
6	62	M.W. Motors Pty. Ltd	(Australia) Paul Hawkins	Alfa Romeo 1600 GTV	3:05.7
7	51	J. & B. Motors	(Australia) Des West	Ford XR Falcon GT	3:06.0
8	49	M. Savva	(Australia) Mike Savva	Ford XR Falcon GT	3:06.8
9	50	Gregory's (Motors) Pty. Ltd.	(Australia) Greg Cusack	Ford XR Falcon GT	NA
10	55	Needham's Motors Pty. Ltd.	(Australia) Warren Weldon	Studebaker Lark	NA

== Race results ==
Pos	Class	Class pos	No	Entrant	Drivers	Car	Laps	Qual Pos
1	D	1	52	Ford Motor Company	(Australia) Harry Firth (Australia) Fred Gibson	Ford XR Falcon GT	130	2
2	D	2	53	Ford Motor Company	(Australia) Ian Geoghegan (Australia) Leo Geoghegan	Ford XR Falcon GT	130	1
3	E	1	60	Alec Mildren Racing Pty. Ltd.	(Australia) Doug Chivas (Australia) Max Stewart	Alfa Romeo 1600 GTV	130	4
4	E	2	61	Alec Mildren Racing Pty. Ltd.	(Australia) Kevin Bartlett (Australia) Laurie Stewart	Alfa Romeo 1600 GTV	130	3
5	C	1	30	British Motor Corporation	(United Kingdom) Tony Fall (Australia) Bob Holden	Morris Cooper S	128	14
6	C	2	37	C. Smith	(Australia) Charlie Smith (Australia) Barry Seton	Morris Cooper S	127	15
7	C	3	29	British Motor Corporation	(Finland) Timo Mäkinen (Australia) John French	Morris Cooper S	127	12
8	C	4	28	British Motor Corporation	(United Kingdom) Paddy Hopkirk (Australia) Brian Foley	Morris Cooper S	126	11
9	E	3	63	S.T.P. Scientifically Treated Petroleum Australia	(Australia) Arthur Davis (Australia) Paul Mander	Alfa Romeo 1600 GTV	126	20
10	C	5	40	Marque Motors	(Australia) Damon Beck (Australia) Lakis Manticas	Morris Cooper S	125	18
11	D	3	55	Needham's Motors Pty. Ltd.	(Australia) Warren Weldon (Australia) John Hall	Studebaker Lark	124	10
12	C	6	45	Martinz Place	(Australia) John Millyard (Australia) Andy Frankel	Morris Cooper S	124	16
13	D	4	49	M. Savva	(Australia) Mike Savva (Australia) Bob Wilkinson	Ford XR Falcon GT	124	8
14	C	7	36	Baulkam Hills Service Station	(Australia) Peter Brown (Australia) Bob Cook	Morris Cooper S	123	21
15	D	5	58	Bill Burns	(Australia) Bill Burns (Australia) Chris Brauer	Alfa Romeo Giulia Super	122	23
16	D	6	57	Scuderia Veloce	(Australia) David McKay (Australia) George Reynolds	Audi Super 90	122	25
17	D	7	50	Gregory's (Motors) Pty. Ltd.	(Australia) Greg Cusack (Australia) Bill Brown	Ford XR Falcon GT	121	9
18	D	8	54	Ford Motor Company	(Australia) Bob Jane (Australia) Spencer Martin	Ford XR Falcon GT	118	5
19	E	4	64	Barnard Auto. Spares	(Australia) Barry Sharp (Australia) Lindsay Derriman	Dodge Phoenix TD2	118	29
20	C	8	42	Scuderia Veloce	(Australia) Bill Tuckey (Australia) Max Stahl	Fiat 124	118	31
21	C	9	27	Victorian Police Motor Sports Club	(Australia) Fred Sutherland (Australia) Allan Mottram	Ford XR Falcon Automatic	117	22
22	D	9	48	Australian Motor Industries Ltd.	(Australia) Bob Young (Australia) Bob Sorrenson	Triumph 2000	117	33
23	A	1	2	Datsun Racing Team	(Australia) John Roxburgh (Australia) Doug Whiteford	Datsun 1000	117	38
24	C	10	47	John Caskey Pty. Ltd.	(Australia) Bill Daly (Australia) George Murray	Fiat 124	117	37
25	E	5	62	M.W. Motors Pty. Ltd.	(Australia) Paul Hawkins (Australia) Syd Fisher	Alfa Romeo 1600 GTV	117	6
26	A	2	12	Australian Motor Industries Ltd.	(Australia) Dick Thurston (Australia) Bill Buckle	Toyota Corolla	116	44
27	B	1	16	Gordon Stewarts Sports Car Centre	(Australia) Don Holland (Australia) Peter Cray	Morris Cooper	116	36
28	A	3	1	Datsun Racing Team	(Japan) Kunimitsu Takahashi (Japan) Hideo Oishi	Datsun 1000	116	40
29	C	11	41	Scuderia Veloce	(Australia) Mike Kable (Australia) John Smailes	Fiat 124	115	32
30	A	4	8	Eiffel Tower Motors Pty. Ltd.	(Australia) Jack Nougher (Australia) David O'Keefe	Hillman GT	114	42
31	A	5	9	B.P. Olympic Service Station (Cowra)	(Australia) Bob Edgerton (Australia) David Toshack	Hillman GT	114	51
32	B	2	24	Sharton Motors (Maitland)	(Australia) George Garth (Australia) Geoff Westbury	Hillman Arrow	114	47
33	C	12	35	Frank Crott Motors Pty. Ltd.	(Australia) Gary Cooke (Australia) Trevor Meehan	Fiat 124	113	30
34	C	13	31	C. Kennedy	(Australia) Carl Kennedy (Australia) Jack Murray	Prince Skyline GT	113	39
35	B	3	15	A. Treloar	(Australia) Doug Macarthur (Australia) Arthur Treloar	Hillman Arrow	111	48
36	B	4	25	Everybody's Magazine	(Australia) Jane Richardson (Australia) Midge Whiteman	Morris 1100S	110	58
37	B	5	18	D. Frazer	(Australia) David Frazer (Australia) Bernie Breen	Renault R8	109	57
38	C	14	34	Frank Crott Motors Pty. Ltd.	(Australia) Lynn Brown (Australia) David Bye	Fiat 850	109	55
39	B	6	13	C. Hodgins	(Australia) Clyde Hodgins (Australia) Kevin Nipperess	Morris 1100S	108	56
40	D	10	59	Wright Ford Motors	(Australia) Bruce McIntyre (Australia) Ken Stacey	Ford XR Falcon GT	106	13
41	A	6	5	C. J. Cocran	(Australia) Chris Cronan (Australia) Steve Parkes	Holden HB Torana	103	60
42	A	7	6	Dependable Motors (Sales) Pty. Ltd.	(Australia) Bruce Darke (Australia) Bill Ford	Datsun 1300	102	59
43	B	7	20	Marque Motors	(Australia) Lindsay Adcock (Australia) Mike Schneider	Morris Cooper	100	35
44	A	8	3	Datsun Racing Team	(Australia) Jim Smith (Australia) John Colwell	Datsun 1300	100	52
45	B	8	17	Vaughan & Lane Pty. Ltd.	(Australia) Bill Stanley (Australia) Digby Cooke	Morris Cooper	96	43
46	B	9	19	J. Thompson	(Australia) Jeff Thompson (Australia) Bob Romano	Ford Cortina Mk.I 1500	96	49
47	D	11	56	British & Continental Cars Pty. Ltd.	(Australia) Gerry Lister (Australia) David Seldon	Volvo 122S	86	26
48	C	15	44	H. Taylor	(Australia) Don Smith (Australia) Herb Taylor	Holden HD X2	75	27
DNF	A		7	Dunbier Motors Pty. Ltd.	(Australia) Lindsay Little (Australia) Stan Pomroy	Hillman GT		53
DNF	A		4	Datsun Racing Team	(Australia) Barry Tapsall (Australia) Bevan Gibson	Datsun 1300		50
DNF	B		22	Rural Motors Pty. Ltd.	(Australia) Glen Mackinnon (Australia) John T. Smith	Ford Cortina Mk.I 1500	111	54
DNF	B		23	Varsity Auto Centre	(Australia) Rick Radford (Australia) John Prisk	Morris Cooper	64	28
DNF	C		33	Gordon Stewart's Car Centre	(Australia) Mal Brewster (Australia) Bob Skelton	Morris Cooper S	121	17
DNF	C		32	M. Bailey	(Australia) Murray Bailey (Australia) John Hicks	Prince Skyline GT		34
DNF	C		46	Denis Geary Motors Pty. Ltd.	(Australia) Gary Hodge (Australia) Glyn Scott	Morris Cooper S	44	24
DNF	C		26	J. Leffler	(Australia) John Leffler (Australia) Les Carne	Morris Cooper S	116	19
DSQ	D		51	J. & B. Motors	(Australia) Bob Beasley (Australia) Des West	Ford XR Falcon GT	128	7
DSQ	A		11	Australian Motor Industries Ltd.	(Australia) Barry Ferguson (Australia) Brian Sampson	Toyota Corolla	117	45
DSQ	A		10	Australian Motor Industries Ltd.	(Australia) Bruce Hindhaugh (Australia) Peter Macrow	Toyota Corolla	116	46
DSQ	B		21	Peter Williamson Pty. Ltd	(Australia) Peter Williamson (Australia) Alex Macarthur	Toyota Corona	116	41

== Statistics ==
- Pole Position - #53 Ian Geoghegan - 3:03.0
- Fastest Lap - #52 Fred Gibson - 3:03 (lap record)
- Average Speed - 116 km/h
- Race Time - 6:55:08
