= 2016 Sandown 500 =

Supercar motor racing event

(Victoria (state)) 2016 Wilson Security Sandown 500
Event Information
- Round 10 of 14 in the 2016 International V8 Supercars Championship
- Date: 16–18 September 2016
- Location: Melbourne, Victoria
- Venue: Sandown Raceway
- Weather: Friday: overcast Saturday: fine Sunday: intermittent showers

Results
Race 1
Distance	143 laps	445 km
Pole position	Jamie Whincup; Paul Dumbrell; Triple Eight Race Engineering	
Winner	Garth Tander; Warren Luff; Holden Racing Team	3:30:56.7695

The 2016 Wilson Security Sandown 500 was a motor racing event for Supercars, held from 16 to 18 September 2016 at the Sandown Raceway in Melbourne, Victoria, Australia and consisted of one race of 445 kilometres in length. It was the tenth event of fourteen in the 2016 International V8 Supercars Championship and hosted Race 20 of the season. It was also the first event of the 2016 Pirtek Enduro Cup. The event was the 46th running of the Sandown 500.

The race was scheduled to be run over a distance of 161 laps (500 km), however the race was shortened to 143 laps after an opening lap crash involving James Golding caused damage to a tyre barrier. The race was stopped in order for repairs to be carried out on the tyre barrier. The shortening of the race was per V8 Supercars regulations that call for the race to end 3 hours, 30 minutes after the start. The race, which featured mixed conditions due to intermittent showers during the afternoon, was won by the Holden Racing Team pairing of Garth Tander and Warren Luff, three tenths of a second clear of the car of Shane van Gisbergen and Alexandre Prémat. Will Davison and Jonathon Webb completed the podium. The pole-sitting car of Jamie Whincup and Paul Dumbrell finished 13th after receiving a drive-through penalty for a pit stop infringement.

== Report ==
=== Background ===
The event was the 46th running of the Sandown 500, which was first held in 1964 as a six-hour race for series production touring cars. It was the twelfth time the race had been held as part of the Supercars Championship and the fourth time it formed part of the Enduro Cup. The defending winners of the race were Mark Winterbottom and Steve Owen.

The event was promoted as a "retro round", with teams encouraged to use adaptations of Australian touring car liveries from the 1960s, 1970s and 1980s, although some teams extended beyond these parameters when devising a livery. The following cars carried a retro livery during the event:

- 8: Brad Jones Racing - Cooper Tools livery used by the team in Auscar in the early 1990s
- 14: Brad Jones Racing - based on the pattern used for the Holden Dealer Racing Team in the 1968 Hardie-Ferodo 500 although with current sponsors colours, the cars had no resemblance to each other
- 17: DJR Team Penske - Shell Helix livery used by the team in 2003 and 2004
- 23: Nissan Motorsport - livery used by the class-winning Datsun 1300 in the 1966 Gallaher 500
- 33 and 34: Garry Rogers Motorsport - livery used by the championship-winning Volvo Dealer Team in 1986
- 55: Rod Nash Racing - Supercheap Auto livery used by Steven Ellery Racing in 2002
- 66: DJR Team Penske - based on the livery of Team Penske's 1972 Indianapolis 500-winning car
- 90: Erebus Motorsport - based on Penrite branding used from the 1950s to the 1980s
- 96: Nissan Motorsport - GB Galvanizing livery used in Australian NASCAR in 1997
- 222: Lucas Dumbrell Motorsport - Phil Munday's Panel Works livery used on dirt Late Model cars in the 1970s
- 888: Triple Eight Race Engineering - Caltex livery used by Colin Bond Racing in the early 1990s

A number of teams also dressed their members in period clothing.

Changes were made to the race regulations, with the soft compound tyre being used in the race for the first time and the number of compulsory pit stops being reduced from four to three. The requirement for cars to make four compulsory pit stops had been introduced for the 2013 race, when the engines used by Nissan Motorsport and Erebus Motorsport (which was then running Mercedes-Benz E63 AMGs) struggled to match the fuel economy of the Ford and Holden engines. With Erebus Motorsport switching to Holden VF Commodores for the 2016 season and Nissan Motorsport improving the performance of its engines, the decision was made to reduce the number of compulsory pit stops. Nissan Motorsport were unconcerned by the change, with team owner and driver Todd Kelly saying: "We have gone ahead in leaps and bounds in economy since the four stops were implemented – everyone has...If we were worried about it we would have put something up to the commission, which we haven’t done."

A new FIA regulation saw changes made to the seat belts used in the cars. Previously, elastic straps had been used to keep the seat belts out of the way during driver changes. An investigation by the FIA found that the elastic straps could cause the seat belts to slip in a frontal impact, increasing the risk of injury to the driver. As a result, Supercars mandated that the elastic straps be removed. During test days prior to the event, teams found that the removal of the elastic straps increased the time required for a driver change, noting that this could have an impact during pit stops with a short refuelling time.

Jamie Whincup entered the event as the championship leader, 137 points ahead of his teammate Shane van Gisbergen, with the third Triple Eight driver, Lowndes, a further 61 points behind in third. Garth Tander and Warren Luff were the defending Enduro Cup champions.

=== Practice ===
Three 30-minute practice sessions were held on Friday, with the two afternoon sessions being open only to the co-drivers. The morning session was open to all drivers, though only regular championship drivers took part. Fabian Coulthard set the fastest time ahead of Chaz Mostert and Van Gisbergen. The session was mostly free of incidents, though James Moffat had to return to the pit garage with a loose driver's window. The first of the co-driver sessions was topped by Steven Richards, ahead of Tony D'Alberto and Luff. A number of drivers went off the circuit during the session but were able to rejoin. Ashley Walsh stopped on the track with an electrical problem with five minutes remaining, causing a red flag. D'Alberto went quickest in the final Friday session, with Richards in second ahead of Steve Owen. A fourth and final 30-minute session was held on Saturday morning and was open to all drivers, though only five co-drivers completed laps during the session. The session was red-flagged at the halfway mark after a traffic cone used to mark the edge of the circuit at Turn 6 was dragged on to the track. Whincup set the fastest time, going 0.0002 seconds quicker than Scott McLaughlin, with Van Gisbergen in third. Todd Kelly stopped on the track at the end of the session due to an engine problem, prompting his team to change his car's engine prior to the qualifying session.

Practice summary
Session	Day	Fastest lap				
Session	Day	No.	Driver	Team	Car	Time
Practice 1	Friday	66	(New Zealand) Fabian Coulthard	DJR Team Penske	Ford FG X Falcon	1:09.1233
Practice 2	Friday	888	(New Zealand) Steven Richards	Triple Eight Race Engineering	Holden VF Commodore	1:09.7416
Practice 3	Friday	17	(Australia) Tony D'Alberto	DJR Team Penske	Ford FG X Falcon	1:09.1656
Practice 4	Saturday	88	(Australia) Jamie Whincup	Triple Eight Race Engineering	Holden VF Commodore	1:08.9245

=== Qualifying – Race 20 ===
Qualifying for Race 20 consisted of three parts: a 20-minute qualifying session and two 20-lap (60 km) qualifying races. The qualifying session was contested by regular championship drivers and set the grid for the first of the qualifying races, which was contested by co-drivers. The results of the first qualifying race set the grid for the second, where the main drivers took part. The results of the second qualifying race decided the grid for Race 20.

==== Qualifying ====
The qualifying session was held on Saturday morning. Todd Kelly did not take part in the first half the session as his team completed the engine change it had started after the final practice session. Mostert set the fastest lap time, putting his co-driver Owen on pole position for the first of the qualifying races. Whincup was second fastest, 0.0084 seconds slower than Mostert. Coulthard completed the top three ahead of Tander and Moffat.

==== Qualifying Race 1 ====
Qualifying Race 1 was held on Saturday afternoon. Paul Dumbrell, starting second, made the best of the start to move into the lead ahead of Owen and Luke Youlden. Dean Canto locked a brake going into the first corner and hit the rear of D'Alberto, sending D'Alberto into a spin. Steven Richards was forced to stop to avoid a collision with D'Alberto's car. Canto was given a drive-through penalty for his role in the incident. Craig Baird went off the circuit at Turn 4 after locking his front brakes but was able to rejoin. Dumbrell quickly built a lead over Owen, with Youlden engaged in a close battle with Luff for third place. On lap 10, Chris van der Drift made a mistake at Turn 7 and hit the kerb, which punctured a tyre and damaged the suspension. He retired from the race at the end of the lap. Dumbrell took victory by 7.6 seconds over Owen, while Youlden was passed by both Luff and Jonathon Webb on the penultimate lap. The top ten was completed by David Wall, James Golding, Alexandre Prémat, Jack Perkins and Jack Le Brocq. Richie Stanaway was disqualified from the race when it was found that his car's tyres were below the minimum tyre pressure of 17 psi.

==== Qualifying Race 2 ====
Qualifying Race 2 was held later on Saturday afternoon. Mostert made a slow start from second place and then ran wide at the first corner, dropping to eighth place. As he rejoined the circuit, Moffat was pushed into Cam Waters, who went off the circuit and became bogged in the wet grass. The safety car was deployed to allow Waters' car to be retrieved. The race restarted on lap 5 and Tander put pressure on Whincup for the lead. McLaughlin passed Will Davison for third place on lap 6; he was followed by Coulthard on lap 8. Davison continued to struggle for pace, dropping to ninth by lap 11. Coulthard was pushed off the track by Van Gisbergen on lap 17 as the latter attempted a pass at Turn 9. Coulthard then made contact with Davison at Turn 12, causing Davison to run wide and lose positions to Tim Slade and Michael Caruso. Van Gisbergen slowed on the main straight to allow Coulthard back through. Coulthard was then told to redress his pass on Davison, which he did on the final lap. Whincup took victory to put himself and Dumbrell on pole position for Race 20. It was the pair's third consecutive pole position at the Sandown 500. Tander finished second ahead of Garry Rogers Motorsport teammates McLaughlin and Moffat. Mostert recovered to finish fifth, with James Courtney, Van Gisbergen, Slade, Caruso and Davison completing the top ten.

=== Race 20 ===
Race 20 was held on Sunday afternoon and the race regulations required each car to make at least three pit stops during the race. Each driver was required to complete a minimum of 54 laps out of the scheduled 161. All of the co-drivers were selected to start the race, with Dumbrell lining up on pole position ahead of Luff, Wall, Golding and Owen. Dumbrell had a lot of wheelspin off the line and dropped to fourth, while Walsh made a good start from eighth to move into third place, behind Luff and Wall. There was slight contact between Golding and Perkins at the first corner which damaged the front-right tyre on Golding's car. The tyre deflated at the end of the back straight and Golding went straight ahead at Turn 6, making heavy contact with the tyre wall. The safety car was deployed but with extensive repairs required for the tyre barrier, the race was red-flagged on lap 3. As per the regulations, all of the cars followed the safety car into the pit lane and teams were allowed to perform certain work on the cars. The contact with Golding had damaged the exhaust outlet on Perkins' car, which the Holden Racing Team was able to rectify during the red flag period. While tyre changes are usually not permitted under red flag conditions, the stewards gave teams the option to change to wet tyres as light rain had begun to fall. The red flag period meant that the race would eventually finish short of the scheduled 161 laps.

After a delay of 26 minutes, the tyre barrier was repaired and the race was restarted under the control of the safety car. The safety car returned to the pit lane at the end of lap 6, with Luff opening a small lead over Wall and Dumbrell putting pressure on Walsh for third place. Macauley Jones spun at Turn 4 on lap 12, dropping to the back of the field. Canto moved into the top 15 on the same lap, having started in 22nd place. On lap 14, Webb ran wide at Turn 4 and lost places to Richards and Aaren Russell, while Dumbrell passed Walsh for third place at Turn 9. The following lap saw Richards spin at Turn 4 and drop to 24th place; Russell Ingall did the same one lap later and also hit the tyre wall, damaging the front guard on his car and dropping to last place. The first round of pit stops began on lap 21 when D'Alberto came into the pit lane; he was followed by Stanaway on lap 25. Rain began to fall on lap 35 and the leaders came into the pit lane to change to wet tyres on lap 37. After the first round of pit stops was completed, Luff continued to lead while Dumbrell had moved past Wall for second place. Stanaway, Canto and Cameron McConville were all on slick tyres, having made their pit stops before the rain came, while the rest of the field was on wet tyres.

With the rain stopped and the track drying out, Stanaway, Canto and McConville began to move through the field, being over three seconds faster per lap than the race leaders. Dumbrell took the lead from Luff at Turn 9 on lap 49, while rain began falling again on lap 50. Despite this, Stanaway and Canto were up to third and fourth respectively on lap 51, while McConville moved up to twelfth place one lap later. With the rain continuing and the track getting wetter, Canto went off at Turn 4 on lap 55, hitting the wall and becoming stuck in the wet grass. The safety car was deployed and with the co-drivers having completed their minimum of 54 laps, most of the leading cars made a pit stop for a driver change. Dumbrell, Walsh and Perkins all stayed out. Both of the DJR Team Penske cars, now with Coulthard and Pye at the wheel, had changed to slick tyres along with the car of Rick Kelly. The race went back to green flag conditions on lap 58 with Dumbrell leading from Walsh, Perkins, Aaren Russell and Tander. Prodrive Racing Australia were able to repair Canto's car and it rejoined the race with Winterbottom at the wheel, three laps off the lead.

The rain stopped again and a dry line began to appear on lap 65. With fresher wet tyres, Tander and McLaughlin had moved up to second and third respectively by lap 68, with Dumbrell continuing to lead. Walsh made a pit stop on lap 72 to fit slick tyres and hand the car over to Slade. Mostert and Perkins stopped one lap later to change to slick tyres, with Courtney taking over from Perkins. The leaders stopped on lap 74 to change to slick tyres. As Dumbrell did not make a pit stop on lap 55, his car required more fuel than those behind and Whincup, having taken over the car, emerged from the pit lane behind Tander, McLaughlin, Todd Kelly and Lowndes. Coulthard, Rick Kelly and Nick Percat assumed the top three positions, having stayed out after taking on slick tyres at the previous pit stop. Tander was fourth before losing the place to McLaughlin on lap 79. Dumbrell was found to have removed his seat belts too early during the pit stop and Whincup was given a drive-through penalty as a result, dropping him to 18th place. Coulthard made a pit stop on lap 95, followed by Rick Kelly and Percat on lap 96. This gave the race lead to McLaughlin, with Tander, Van Gisbergen, Davison and Lowndes completing the top five. Waters went off at Turn 4 on lap 98 with oil leaking from under the car; he retired from the race at the end of the lap. Tander pressured McLaughlin for the lead, pulling alongside on the main straight on consecutive laps but McLaughlin was able to successfully defend the position.

The car of Slade and Walsh was given a drive-through penalty after Slade was found to have left the pit box before fastening his seat belt in the car's previous pit stop. Tander made his final pit stop on lap 104, followed by McLaughlin and Van Gisbergen on lap 105. The pit stop process saw Tander pass McLaughlin, who went off at the first corner after rejoining the circuit and lost another position to Van Gisbergen. Lowndes made his final pit stop on lap 106 and emerged ahead of McLaughlin. McLaughlin tried to pass Lowndes at Turn 4 but lost momentum going on to the back straight, losing a place to Davison. Lowndes, on cold tyres, locked a brake going into Turn 9 and went off the circuit, dropping behind Davison, McLaughlin and Mostert. Tander regained the race lead when Coulthard made a pit stop on lap 119, with an eleven-second gap back to Van Gisbergen who would assume second place when Rick Kelly made his final pit stop. On lap 122, the front-left guard on Tander's car peeled back. With the guard being securely fastened by the rear mounts, the race stewards deemed that the car was safe and that the Holden Racing Team was not required to call Tander into the pit lane for repairs. Rick Kelly stopped on lap 125, leaving Van Gisbergen in second place and closing the gap to Tander, whose pace had been affected by the damaged guard. With the regulations stating that the race must end one lap after 4:48 pm, the race finished at the end of lap 143. Tander held on to take victory, 0.3 seconds clear of Van Gisbergen. Davison completed the podium, despite driving with a broken header in the closing laps, ahead of McLaughlin and Mostert. Coulthard finished sixth, having moved up the order in the closing stages on fresher tyres, ahead of Todd Kelly, Lowndes, Percat and Rick Kelly. With Whincup finishing 13th, Van Gisbergen left the event with a 7-point championship lead over Whincup. Lowndes maintained third in the points standings, while McLaughlin moved ahead of Winterbottom after the latter finished 24th.

==== Post-race ====
The victory was Tander's first since the 2014 Castrol Townsville 500 and Luff's first since the 2013 Armor All Gold Coast 600. It was the Holden Racing Team's first race win since the season-opening Clipsal 500 Adelaide. Team principal Adrian Burgess said the race was a "massively important win for us and our partners", with the result coming one month after Holden announced it would no longer provide support to the team in 2017. Despite finishing second, Van Gisbergen said the stewards' decision to not give a mechanical black flag to Tander for the loose guard was the right one, saying: "If they did black flag it it would have been a hollow victory." Tander himself expressed surprise at the way the guard came off and noted its effect on the car's performance: "We had been doing it comfortably to that point but it became very, very difficult to drive."

The car of David Reynolds and Baird was disqualified from the race as Reynolds did not achieve the required total resting time for a drive during the race. The rules stipulate the each driver must have a resting time of at least one-third of the scheduled race distance. The rule has the effect of creating a minimum driving time for each driver of 54 of the scheduled 161 laps. As Baird completed only 48 laps, the race stewards excluded the car from the race results, with all cars finishing behind the pair moving up one place. The team cited a miscommunication with Baird as the reason for the error.

== Results ==
=== Race 20 ===
==== Qualifying ====
Pos.	No.	Driver	Team	Car	Time
1	55	(Australia) Chaz Mostert	Rod Nash Racing	Ford FG X Falcon	1:08.6147
2	88	(Australia) Jamie Whincup	Triple Eight Race Engineering	Holden VF Commodore	1:08.6231
3	66	(New Zealand) Fabian Coulthard	DJR Team Penske	Ford FG X Falcon	1:08.7663
4	2	(Australia) Garth Tander	Holden Racing Team	Holden VF Commodore	1:08.7905
5	34	(Australia) James Moffat	Garry Rogers Motorsport	Volvo S60	1:08.8112
6	19	(Australia) Will Davison	Tekno Autosports	Holden VF Commodore	1:08.8142
7	33	(New Zealand) Scott McLaughlin	Garry Rogers Motorsport	Volvo S60	1:08.8237
8	22	(Australia) James Courtney	Holden Racing Team	Holden VF Commodore	1:08.8444
9	97	(New Zealand) Shane van Gisbergen	Triple Eight Race Engineering	Holden VF Commodore	1:08.8523
10	23	(Australia) Michael Caruso	Nissan Motorsport	Nissan Altima L33	1:08.8865
11	1	(Australia) Mark Winterbottom	Prodrive Racing Australia	Ford FG X Falcon	1:08.9113
12	17	(Australia) Scott Pye	DJR Team Penske	Ford FG X Falcon	1:09.0145
13	6	(Australia) Cam Waters	Prodrive Racing Australia	Ford FG X Falcon	1:09.0182
14	888	(Australia) Craig Lowndes	Triple Eight Race Engineering	Holden VF Commodore	1:09.0403
15	8	(Australia) Jason Bright	Brad Jones Racing	Holden VF Commodore	1:09.0441
16	90	(Australia) David Reynolds	Erebus Motorsport	Holden VF Commodore	1:09.0443
17	222	(Australia) Nick Percat	Lucas Dumbrell Motorsport	Holden VF Commodore	1:09.0643
18	14	(Australia) Tim Slade	Brad Jones Racing	Holden VF Commodore	1:09.1333
19	15	(Australia) Rick Kelly	Nissan Motorsport	Nissan Altima L33	1:09.2792
20	21	(Australia) Tim Blanchard	Britek Motorsport	Holden VF Commodore	1:09.3117
21	111	(New Zealand) Chris Pither	Super Black Racing	Ford FG X Falcon	1:09.3273
22	3	(New Zealand) Andre Heimgartner	Lucas Dumbrell Motorsport	Holden VF Commodore	1:09.3849
23	18	(Australia) Lee Holdsworth	Team 18	Holden VF Commodore	1:09.4447
24	96	(Australia) Dale Wood	Nissan Motorsport	Nissan Altima L33	1:09.4685
25	7	(Australia) Todd Kelly	Nissan Motorsport	Nissan Altima L33	1:09.5573
26	4	(Australia) Shae Davies	Erebus Motorsport	Holden VF Commodore	1:09.8481

==== Qualifying Race 1 ====
Pos.	No.	Driver	Team	Car	Laps	Time/Retired	Grid
1	88	(Australia) Paul Dumbrell	Triple Eight Race Engineering	Holden VF Commodore	20	23:30.0080	2
2	55	(Australia) Steve Owen	Rod Nash Racing	Ford FG X Falcon	20	+7.6 s	1
3	2	(Australia) Warren Luff	Holden Racing Team	Holden VF Commodore	20	+9.6 s	4
4	19	(Australia) Jonathon Webb	Tekno Autosports	Holden VF Commodore	20	+11.5 s	6
5	66	(Australia) Luke Youlden	DJR Team Penske	Ford FG X Falcon	20	+12.2 s	3
6	33	(Australia) David Wall	Garry Rogers Motorsport	Volvo S60	20	+12.9 s	7
7	34	(Australia) James Golding	Garry Rogers Motorsport	Volvo S60	20	+13.4 s	5
8	97	(France) Alexandre Prémat	Triple Eight Race Engineering	Holden VF Commodore	20	+13.7 s	9
9	22	(Australia) Jack Perkins	Holden Racing Team	Holden VF Commodore	20	+14.0 s	8
10	6	(Australia) Jack Le Brocq	Prodrive Racing Australia	Ford FG X Falcon	20	+14.7 s	13
11	23	(Australia) Dean Fiore	Nissan Motorsport	Nissan Altima L33	20	+16.8 s	10
12	14	(Australia) Ashley Walsh	Brad Jones Racing	Holden VF Commodore	20	+18.7 s	18
13	222	(Australia) Cameron McConville	Lucas Dumbrell Motorsport	Holden VF Commodore	20	+19.0 s	17
14	18	(Australia) Karl Reindler	Team 18	Holden VF Commodore	20	+22.1 s	23
15	21	(Australia) Macauley Jones	Britek Motorsport	Holden VF Commodore	20	+24.3 s	20
16	888	(New Zealand) Steven Richards	Triple Eight Race Engineering	Holden VF Commodore	20	+26.0 s	14
17	3	(Australia) Aaren Russell	Lucas Dumbrell Motorsport	Holden VF Commodore	20	+29.1 s	22
18	15	(Australia) Russell Ingall	Nissan Motorsport	Nissan Altima L33	20	+29.6 s	19
19	17	(Australia) Tony D'Alberto	DJR Team Penske	Ford FG X Falcon	20	+29.8 s	12
20	96	(Australia) David Russell	Nissan Motorsport	Nissan Altima L33	20	+32.2 s	24
21	7	(Australia) Matt Campbell	Nissan Motorsport	Nissan Altima L33	20	+32.5 s	25
22	90	(New Zealand) Craig Baird	Erebus Motorsport	Holden VF Commodore	20	+40.5 s	16
23	8	(Australia) Andrew Jones	Brad Jones Racing	Holden VF Commodore	20	+52.8 s (Note: 35-second time penalty for changing tyres on the grid.)	15
24	1	(Australia) Dean Canto	Prodrive Racing Australia	Ford FG X Falcon	20	+1:17.3	11
Ret	4	(New Zealand) Chris van der Drift	Erebus Motorsport	Holden VF Commodore	10	Suspension	26
DSQ	111	(New Zealand) Richie Stanaway	Super Black Racing	Ford FG X Falcon	20	Disqualified (Note: Stanaway was disqualified from Qualifying Race 1 as his car's tyres were below the minimum tyre pressure.)	21

==== Qualifying Race 2 ====
Pos.	No.	Driver	Team	Car	Laps	Time/Retired	Grid
1	88	(Australia) Jamie Whincup	Triple Eight Race Engineering	Holden VF Commodore	20	27:21.7293	1
2	2	(Australia) Garth Tander	Holden Racing Team	Holden VF Commodore	20	+1.3 s	3
3	33	(New Zealand) Scott McLaughlin	Garry Rogers Motorsport	Volvo S60	20	+2.3 s	6
4	34	(Australia) James Moffat	Garry Rogers Motorsport	Volvo S60	20	+9.3 s	7
5	55	(Australia) Chaz Mostert	Rod Nash Racing	Ford FG X Falcon	20	+10.4 s	2
6	22	(Australia) James Courtney	Holden Racing Team	Holden VF Commodore	20	+13.0 s	9
7	97	(New Zealand) Shane van Gisbergen	Triple Eight Race Engineering	Holden VF Commodore	20	+15.9 s	8
8	14	(Australia) Tim Slade	Brad Jones Racing	Holden VF Commodore	20	+16.5 s	12
9	23	(Australia) Michael Caruso	Nissan Motorsport	Nissan Altima L33	20	+17.4 s	11
10	19	(Australia) Will Davison	Tekno Autosports	Holden VF Commodore	20	+17.7 s	4
11	66	(New Zealand) Fabian Coulthard	DJR Team Penske	Ford FG X Falcon	20	+18.1 s	5
12	888	(Australia) Craig Lowndes	Triple Eight Race Engineering	Holden VF Commodore	20	+18.9 s	16
13	222	(Australia) Nick Percat	Lucas Dumbrell Motorsport	Holden VF Commodore	20	+19.5 s	13
14	15	(Australia) Rick Kelly	Nissan Motorsport	Nissan Altima L33	20	+19.7 s	18
15	18	(Australia) Lee Holdsworth	Team 18	Holden VF Commodore	20	+20.3 s	14
16	3	(New Zealand) Andre Heimgartner	Lucas Dumbrell Motorsport	Holden VF Commodore	20	+23.3 s	17
17	90	(Australia) David Reynolds	Erebus Motorsport	Holden VF Commodore	20	+24.8 s	22
18	7	(Australia) Todd Kelly	Nissan Motorsport	Nissan Altima L33	20	+25.2 s	21
19	21	(Australia) Tim Blanchard	Britek Motorsport	Holden VF Commodore	20	+26.9 s	15
20	96	(Australia) Dale Wood	Nissan Motorsport	Nissan Altima L33	20	+27.2 s	20
21	17	(Australia) Scott Pye	DJR Team Penske	Ford FG X Falcon	20	+27.7 s	19
22	1	(Australia) Mark Winterbottom	Prodrive Racing Australia	Ford FG X Falcon	20	+28.3 s	24
23	8	(Australia) Jason Bright	Brad Jones Racing	Holden VF Commodore	20	+28.4 s	23
24	111	(New Zealand) Chris Pither	Super Black Racing	Ford FG X Falcon	20	+28.8 s	26
25	4	(Australia) Shae Davies	Erebus Motorsport	Holden VF Commodore	20	+29.3 s	25
26	6	(Australia) Cam Waters	Prodrive Racing Australia	Ford FG X Falcon	18	+2 laps	10

==== Race ====
Pos.	No.	Driver	Team	Car	Laps	Time/Retired	Grid	Points
1	2	(Australia) Garth Tander (Australia) Warren Luff	Holden Racing Team	Holden VF Commodore	143	3:30:56.7695	2	300
2	97	(New Zealand) Shane van Gisbergen (France) Alexandre Prémat	Triple Eight Race Engineering	Holden VF Commodore	143	+0.3 s	7	276
3	19	(Australia) Will Davison (Australia) Jonathon Webb	Tekno Autosports	Holden VF Commodore	143	+14.8 s	10	258
4	33	(New Zealand) Scott McLaughlin (Australia) David Wall	Garry Rogers Motorsport	Volvo S60	143	+15.9 s	3	240
5	55	(Australia) Chaz Mostert (Australia) Steve Owen	Rod Nash Racing	Ford FG X Falcon	143	+16.3 s	5	222
6	66	(New Zealand) Fabian Coulthard (Australia) Luke Youlden	DJR Team Penske	Ford FG X Falcon	143	+22.7 s	11	204
7	7	(Australia) Todd Kelly (Australia) Matt Campbell	Nissan Motorsport	Nissan Altima L33	143	+25.8 s	18	192
8	888	(Australia) Craig Lowndes (New Zealand) Steven Richards	Triple Eight Race Engineering	Holden VF Commodore	143	+33.3 s	12	180
9	222	(Australia) Nick Percat (Australia) Cameron McConville	Lucas Dumbrell Motorsport	Holden VF Commodore	143	+36.1 s	13	168
10	15	(Australia) Rick Kelly (Australia) Russell Ingall	Nissan Motorsport	Nissan Altima L33	143	+37.5 s	14	156
11	22	(Australia) James Courtney (Australia) Jack Perkins	Holden Racing Team	Holden VF Commodore	143	+38.4 s	6	144
12	18	(Australia) Lee Holdsworth (Australia) Karl Reindler	Team 18	Holden VF Commodore	143	+43.1 s	15	138
13	88	(Australia) Jamie Whincup (Australia) Paul Dumbrell	Triple Eight Race Engineering	Holden VF Commodore	143	+43.1 s	1	132
14	23	(Australia) Michael Caruso (Australia) Dean Fiore	Nissan Motorsport	Nissan Altima L33	143	+48.8 s	9	126
15	17	(Australia) Scott Pye (Australia) Tony D'Alberto	DJR Team Penske	Ford FG X Falcon	142	+1 lap	21	120
16	14	(Australia) Tim Slade (Australia) Ashley Walsh	Brad Jones Racing	Holden VF Commodore	142	+1 lap	8	114
17	111	(New Zealand) Chris Pither (New Zealand) Richie Stanaway	Super Black Racing	Ford FG X Falcon	142	+1 lap	24	108
18	96	(Australia) Dale Wood (Australia) David Russell	Nissan Motorsport	Nissan Altima L33	142	+1 lap	20	102
19	3	(New Zealand) Andre Heimgartner (Australia) Aaren Russell	Lucas Dumbrell Motorsport	Holden VF Commodore	142	+1 lap	16	96
20	21	(Australia) Tim Blanchard (Australia) Macauley Jones	Britek Motorsport	Holden VF Commodore	141	+2 laps	19	90
21	8	(Australia) Jason Bright (Australia) Andrew Jones	Brad Jones Racing	Holden VF Commodore	141	+2 laps	23	84
22	4	(Australia) Shae Davies (New Zealand) Chris van der Drift	Erebus Motorsport	Holden VF Commodore	141	+2 laps	25	78
23	1	(Australia) Mark Winterbottom (Australia) Dean Canto	Prodrive Racing Australia	Ford FG X Falcon	138	+5 laps	22	72
Ret	6	(Australia) Cam Waters (Australia) Jack Le Brocq	Prodrive Racing Australia	Ford FG X Falcon	98	Engine	26	
Ret	34	(Australia) James Moffat (Australia) James Golding	Garry Rogers Motorsport	Volvo S60	0	Accident	4	
DSQ	90	(Australia) David Reynolds (New Zealand) Craig Baird	Erebus Motorsport	Holden VF Commodore	141	Disqualified (Note: Reynolds and Baird were disqualified from Race 20 as Baird failed to complete one third of the scheduled race distance, meaning that Reynolds did not achieve the required total resting time for a driver during the race.)	17	

== Championship standings after the event ==
- After Race 20 of 29. Only the top five positions are included for both sets of standings.

Drivers' Championship standings

	Pos.	Driver	Points
1	1	(New Zealand) Shane van Gisbergen	2248
1	2	(Australia) Jamie Whincup	2241
	3	(Australia) Craig Lowndes	2091
1	4	(New Zealand) Scott McLaughlin	1989
1	5	(Australia) Mark Winterbottom	1908

Teams' Championship standings

	Pos.	Constructor	Points
	1	Triple Eight Race Engineering	4499
1	2	Holden Racing Team	3226
1	3	Garry Rogers Motorsport	2991
2	4	Nissan Motorsport	2938
3	5	Prodrive Racing Australia	2926
