= George Reynolds =

George Reynolds may refer to:

== Politicians ==
- George Reynolds (MP for Devizes) (died 1577), English politician
- George Reynolds (MP for Rye) (died 1577), English politician
- George M. Reynolds (1862–1935), American politician and businessman

== Sports ==
- George Reynolds (basketball) (born 1947), American basketball player
- George Reynolds (boxer), Welsh lightweight boxing champion
- George Reynolds (racing driver) (1928–2012), winner of the 1964 Bathurst 500

== Others ==
- George Reynolds (businessman) (1937–2021), British businessman and chairman of Darlington Football Club
- George Reynolds (Mormon) (1842–1909), Latter-day Saint leader and a party to the 1878 United States Supreme Court case Reynolds v. United States
- George Reynolds (Medal of Honor) (1839–?), Union Army soldier during the American Civil War
- George Reynolds (priest), English priest, served as Archdeacon of Lincoln from 1725 to 1769
- G. A. Reynolds (George Alfred Reynolds, 1854–1939), artist and art teacher in South Australia
- George Lazenby Reynolds (1927–1991), bishop of the Episcopal Diocese of Tennessee
- George Bernard Reynolds (1853-1925), British geologist and oil industry executive
- George T. Reynolds (1917–2005), American physicist
- George W. M. Reynolds (1814–1879), British author and journalist
- George Reynolds (general), United States Air Force general
