= Ziebell =

Ziebell is a surname. Notable people with the surname include:

- Allie Ziebell (born 2005), American basketball player
- Jack Ziebell (born 1991), Australian rules footballer
- Keith Ziebell (born 1942), Australian cricketer
