= 1968 Hardie-Ferodo 500 =

Motor race in Australia

Seasons
- ← 1967 1969 →

Layout of the Mount Panorama Circuit (1938–1986)

The 1968 Hardie-Ferodo 500 was a production car race held on 6 October 1968 at the Mount Panorama Circuit just outside Bathurst in New South Wales, Australia. It was the ninth running of the Bathurst 500.

The race was won by the Wyong Motors entered Holden Monaro driven by Bruce McPhee (apart from one lap mid-race driven by Barry Mulholland) who defeated the big teams with a tactical strategy of running a buffed hard wearing street tyre rather than a racing tyre. Initially Des West and Ron Marks were classified second but were later disqualified for illegal engine modifications. Second place was then awarded to the factory supported Holden Dealer Racing Team Holden Monaro of Jim Palmer (to that point the best finish by a New Zealander) and Phil West. The AM Roberts entered Holden Monaro driven by Tony Roberts and Bob Watson finished third.

Future two-time Bathurst 1000 winner Allan Grice made his Mount Panorama debut in 1968. Driving with author Bill Tuckey in a Class D Fiat 124 Sport for Scuderia Veloce, the pair finished the race in 18th outright and 9th in class, 11 laps down on the McPhee/Mulholland Monaro.

Midge Whiteman and Christine Cole (who would later be better known as Christine Gibson, the wife of driver Fred Gibson), driving in a Morris Mini De Luxe, contested the race as an all female duo, placing fifth in their class.

== Class structure ==
Cars competed in five classes based on the purchase price (in Australian dollars) of the vehicle.

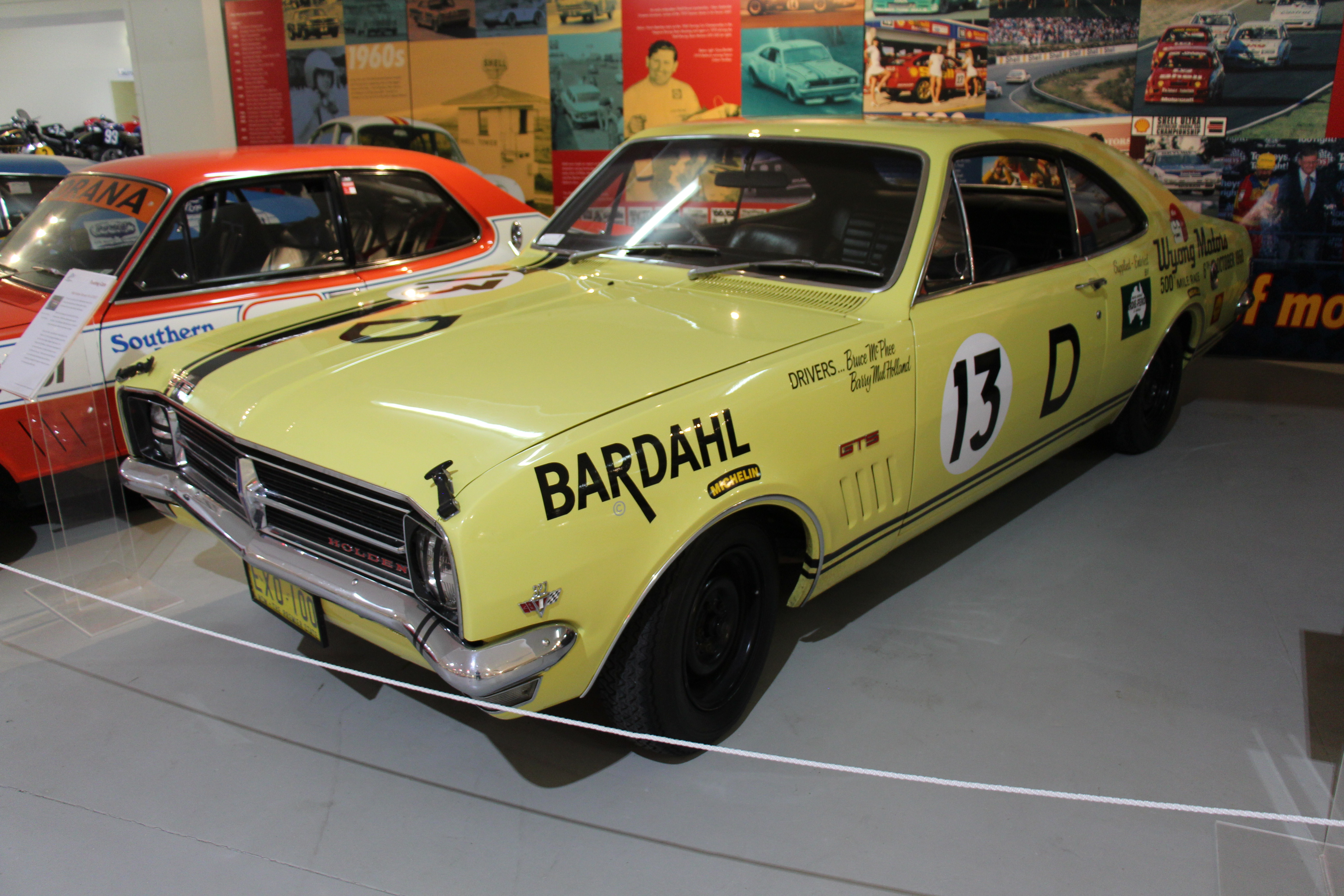
A replica of the winning Holden Monaro GTS327

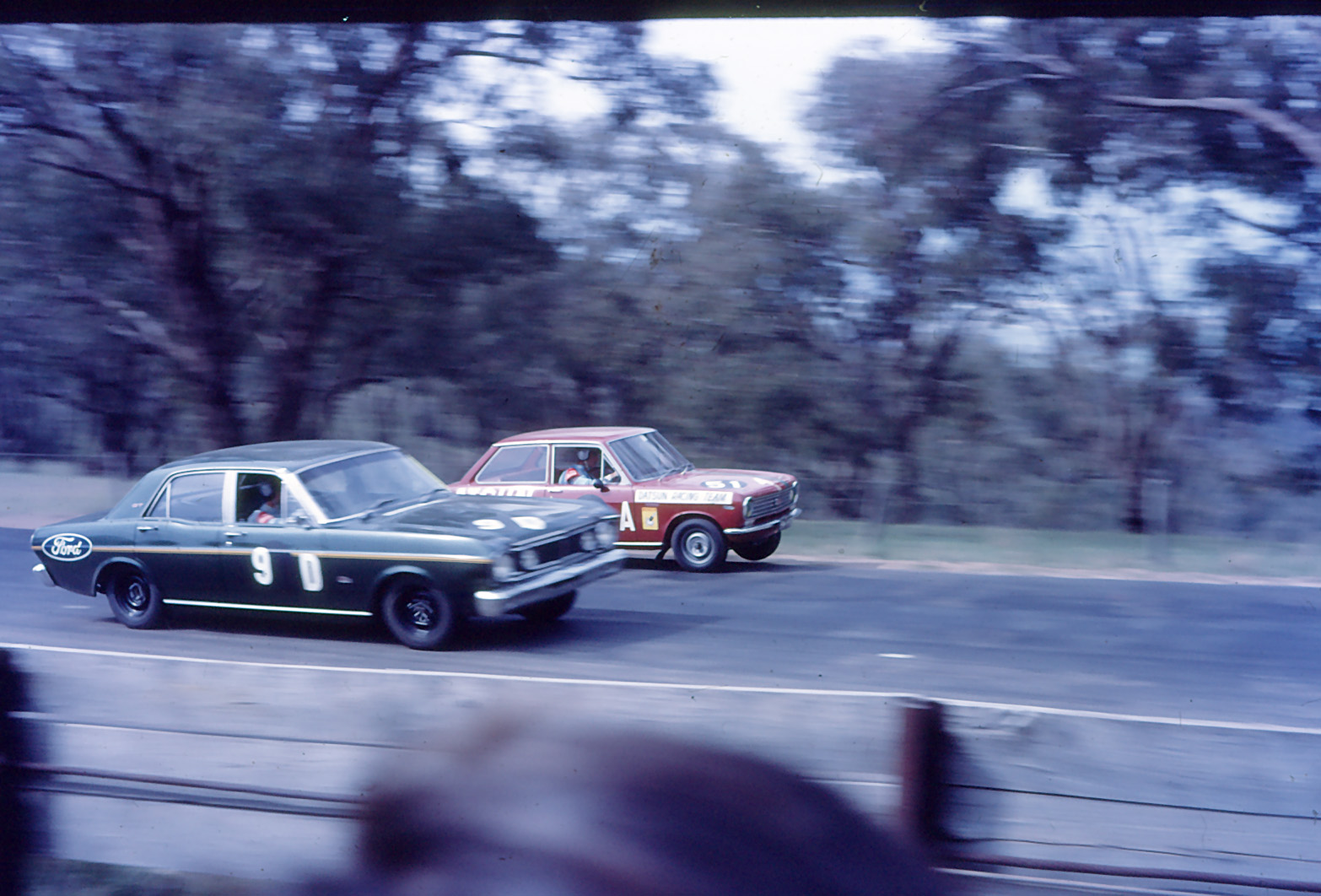
The Seton / Gibson Ford XT Falcon GT at the 1968 Hardie-Ferodo 500

=== Class A ===
Class A was for cars which cost up to $1,850. It was contested by Datsun 1000, Ford Cortina, Hillman GT, Morris Mini De Luxe and Toyota Corolla.

=== Class B ===
The $1,851 to $2,250 class entries were dominated by the Datsun 1600, but also included Hillman Arrow, Hillman Gazelle and Morris 1100S.

=== Class C ===
The $2,251 to $3,000 class was contested by Ford Falcon, Holden Kingswood, Fiat 125 and Morris Cooper S.

=== Class D ===
The $3,001 to $4,500 class featured the outright contenders, Ford Falcon GT and Holden Monaro GTS 327, and also included single entries of Chrysler VE Valiant, Fiat 124 Sport and Studebaker Lark.

=== Class E ===
For cars over $4,500, the class was contested by Alfa Romeo 1750 GTVs and a single Citroen DS21 Pallas.

== Top 10 Qualifiers ==
Pos	No	Team	Driver	Car	Qual
Pole	13	Wyong Motors Pty Ltd	(Australia) Bruce McPhee	Holden HK Monaro GTS327	2:56.7
2	14	Lorack Motors (Granville) Pty Ltd	(Australia) Des West	Holden HK Monaro GTS327	2:56.9
3	23	Holden Dealer Racing Team	(Australia) Paul Hawkins	Holden HK Monaro GTS327	2:59.3
4	8	Ford Motor Company of Australia	(Australia) Ian Geoghegan	Ford XT Falcon GT	2:59.8
5	25	Holden Dealer Racing Team	(Australia) Brian Muir	Holden HK Monaro GTS327	3:00.1
6	24	Holden Dealer Racing Team	(New Zealand) Jim Palmer	Holden HK Monaro GTS327	3:00.5
7	7	Ford Motor Company of Australia	(Australia) Spencer Martin	Ford XR Falcon GT Auto	3:00.5
8	9	Ford Motor Company of Australia	(Australia) Fred Gibson	Ford XT Falcon GT	3:00.9
9	15	AM Roberts	(Australia) Tony Roberts	Holden HK Monaro GTS327	3:02.1
10	3	Brian Foley Motors	(Australia) Brian Foley	Alfa Romeo 1750 GTV	3:02.4

== Results ==
Pos	Class	No	Entrant	Drivers	Car	Laps	Qual Pos
1	D	13	Wyong Motors Pty Ltd	(Australia) Bruce McPhee (Australia) Barry Mulholland	Holden HK Monaro GTS327	130	1
2	D	24	Holden Dealer Racing Team	(New Zealand) Jim Palmer (Australia) Phil West	Holden HK Monaro GTS327	130	6
3	D	15	AM Roberts	(Australia) Tony Roberts (Australia) Bob Watson	Holden HK Monaro GTS327	129	9
4	E	1	Alec Mildren Racing Pty Ltd	(Australia) Kevin Bartlett (Australia) Doug Chivas	Alfa Romeo 1750 GTV	129	11
5	D	25	Holden Dealer Racing Team	(Australia) Brian Muir (Australia) George Reynolds	Holden HK Monaro GTS327	127	5
6	E	3	Brian Foley Motors	(Australia) Brian Foley (Australia) Laurie Stewart	Alfa Romeo 1750 GTV	126	10
7	D	10	Wright Ford Motors	(Australia) Bruce McIntyre (Australia) Ken Stacey	Ford XR Falcon GT	125	15
8	E	5	Canberra Speed Shop	(Australia) Peter Brown (Australia) Ray Gulson	Alfa Romeo 1750 GTV	125	18
9	D	17	Stanmore Auto Port	(Australia) Chris Brauer (Australia) Murray Harrod	Ford XT Falcon GT	125	17
10	C	30	C Smith	(Australia) Don Holland (Australia) Charlie Smith	Morris Cooper S	123	23
11	C	34	Ford Motor Company of Australia	(Australia) Barry Arentz (New Zealand) Mike Champion	Ford XT Falcon 500 V8	123	20
12	D	8	Ford Motor Company of Australia	(Australia) Ian Geoghegan (Australia) Leo Geoghegan	Ford XT Falcon GT	123	4
13	D	21	Needhams Motors Pty Ltd	(Australia) Warren Weldon (Australia) John Hall	Studebaker Lark	123	13
14	C	29	Marque Motors	(Australia) Digby Cooke (Australia) Mal Brewster	Morris Cooper S	121	22
15	B	50	Datsun Racing Team	(Australia) John Roxburgh (Australia) Doug Whiteford	Datsun 1600	120	32
16	C	38	Denis Geary Motors Pty Ltd	(Australia) Damon Beck (Australia) Gary Hodge	Morris Cooper S	120	21
17	C	63	R Marquet	(Australia) Alan Cant (Australia) Ray Marquet	Morris Cooper S	120	24
18	D	26	Scuderia Veloce	(Australia) Allan Grice (Australia) Bill Tuckey	Fiat 124 Sport	119	30
19	B	46	Peter Langwill Autos Pty Ltd	(Australia) Bruce Stewart (Australia) George Garth	Datsun 1600	118	38
20	C	36	W Gracie	(Australia) Warren Gracie (Australia) Don James	Morris Cooper S	118	36
21	B	49	Datsun Racing Team	(Japan) Kunimitsu Takahashi (Japan) Yoshikayo Sunago	Datsun 1600	118	28
22	B	65	Vern Curtin Motors	(Australia) Alton Boddenberg (Australia) Rusty French	Hillman Gazelle	117	35
23	C	61	Varsity Auto Centre	(Australia) John Prisk (Australia) Alan Cameron	Morris Cooper S	116	31
24	B	42	Dependable Motors Pty Ltd	(Australia) Dennis Cooke (Australia) Hans Tholstrup	Datsun 1600	116	44
25	C	33	Tony Basile Motors	(Australia) Tony Basile (Australia) Gary Leggatt	Fiat 125	116	42
26	B	41	Dependable Motors Pty Ltd	(Australia) Bruce Darke (Australia) Bill Ford	Datsun 1600	115	45
27	C	27	Scuderia Veloce	(Australia) Mike Kable (Australia) Ron Kearns	Fiat 125	114	40
28	C	35	Young & Green Pty Ltd	(Australia) Sib Petralia (Australia) Jim Sullivan	Holden HK Kingswood 186S	114	43
29	D	22	C Hodgins	(Australia) Clyde Hodgins (Australia) Stan Pomroy	Chrysler VE Valiant Auto	113	34
30	A	56	AMI Racing Team	(Australia) Bruce Hindhaugh (Australia) Bob Morris	Toyota Corolla	113	49
31	D	9	Ford Motor Company of Australia	(Australia) Fred Gibson (Australia) Barry Seton	Ford XT Falcon GT	113	8
32	A	55	AMI Racing Team	(Australia) Barry Ferguson (Australia) Brian Sampson	Toyota Corolla	113	47
33	B	45	WH Motors Pty Ltd	(Australia) Don Smith (Australia) Herb Taylor	Datsun 1600	112	33
34	B	64	MG Car Club NSW	(Australia) Matt Daddo (Australia) Peter Ulbrich	Datsun 1600	111	56
35	C	66	A Olsen	(Australia) Arthur Olsen (Australia) Ray Scanlen	Morris Cooper S	110	46
36	B	47	Austen & Butta Motors Pty Ltd	(Australia) Joe Butta (Australia) Bob Genders	Hillman Arrow	109	53
37	B	48	Tynan Motors	(Australia) Trevor Mason (Australia) Neil Mason	Morris 1100S	109	54
38	A	52	Central Auto Sales & Services	(Australia) Lionel Ayers (Australia) Max Volkers	Ford Cortina Mk.II 220	107	58
39	B	43	Kenthurst Motors	(Australia) Carl Kennedy (Australia) Jack Mullins	Datsun 1600	107	55
40	A	58	A Johns	(Australia) David Frazer (Australia) Allan Johns	Hillman GT	107	57
41	A	54	P & R Williams	(Australia) Christine Gibson (Australia) Midge Whiteman	Morris Mini De Luxe	98	60
42	D	7	Ford Motor Company of Australia	(Australia) Spencer Martin (Australia) Jim McKeown	Ford XT Falcon GT Auto	95	7
43	C	32	W & N Howes	(Australia) Martin Chenery (Australia) Ernie Johnson	Fiat 125	88	39
44	C	28	Marque Motors	(Australia) Lindsay Adcock (Australia) Bill Stanley	Morris Cooper S	81	26
45	A	57	AMI Racing Team	(Australia) Brian Reed (Australia) Dick Thurston	Toyota Corolla	74	50
46	A	60	North Shore Sporting Car Club	(Australia) Bob Drane (Australia) Jim Laing-Peach	Toyota Corolla	74	52
47	C	31	Frank Croft Motors Pty Ltd	(Australia) Gary Cooke (Australia) Bob Muir	Fiat 125	69	29
48	D	16	M Savva	(Australia) Mike Savva (Australia) Bob Wilkinson	Ford XT Falcon GT	62	16
DNF	C	39	Vern Potts	(Australia) Rick Radford (Australia) David Seldon	Morris Cooper S		37
DNF	C	40	Vern Potts	(Australia) Ron Heylen (Australia) John Smailes	Morris Cooper S	88	25
DNF	D	11	Wright Ford Motors	(Australia) Bob Beasley (Australia) Ray Morris	Ford XT Falcon GT	87	14
DNF	B	44	Eiffeltower Motors	(Australia) "Jack Eiffeltower" (Australia) David O'Keefe	Hillman Gazelle	54	27
DNF	E	4	Citroen Cars (Citco) Pty Ltd	(Australia) Bill Daly (Australia) Glyn Scott	Citroen DS21 Pallas		41
DNF	D	19	I Haynes	(Australia) Ian Haynes (Australia) Max Stahl	Holden HK Monaro GTS327		19
DNF	A	62	Imp Spares & Repairs	(Australia) Mel Mollison (Australia) Roger Withers	Hillman GT		59
DSQ	D	14	Lorack Motors (Granville) Pty Ltd	(Australia) Des West (Australia) Ron Marks	Holden HK Monaro GTS327	130	2
DSQ	E	2	Alec Mildren (Qld)	(Australia) John French (Australia) Frank Gardner	Alfa Romeo 1750 GTV		12
DSQ	D	23	Holden Dealer Racing Team	(Australia) Paul Hawkins (Australia) Bill Brown	Holden HK Monaro GTS327		3
DSQ	A	51	Datsun Racing Team	(Australia) Bill Evans (Australia) John Colwell	Datsun 1000	112	48
DSQ	A	53	Datsun Racing Team	(Australia) Dick Sorenson (Australia) Bevan Gibson	Datsun 1000	112	51
DNS	D	12	Jubilee Motors Pty Ltd	(Australia) Roy Griffiths (Australia) Wayne Rogerson	Ford XT Falcon GT		
DNS	A	59	Bryan Thompson Racing	(Australia) Adrian Ryan (Australia) Bryan Thompson	Ford Cortina 220 Mk.I		
DNS	D	20	Ken Waggott Speed Equipment	(Australia) N Petrilli (Australia) W Slattery	Holden HK Monaro GTS327		

Note : Jack Nougher competed in car 44 under the name "Jack Eiffeltower" in this race.

== Statistics ==
- Pole Position – No.13 Bruce McPhee – 2:56.7
- Fastest Lap – No.13 Bruce McPhee – 2:58 (lap record)
- Average Speed – 119 km/h
- Race time of winning car – 6:44:07
