= Bill Buckle =

Australian cricketer (born 1943)

Personal information
- Full name: William Harvey Buckle
- Born: 3 June 1943 (age 83); Brisbane, Queensland, Australia
- Batting: Left-handed
- Bowling: Right-arm medium-pace
- Role: Batsman

Domestic team information
- Years: Team
- 1963/64–1971/72: Queensland

Career statistics
Competition	FC	List A
Matches	23	1
Runs scored	1,114	32
Batting average	28.56	32.00
100s/50s	2/3	0/0
Top score	207	32
Balls bowled	88	0
Wickets	0	–
Bowling average	–	–
5 wickets in innings	–	–
10 wickets in match	–	–
Best bowling	–	–
Catches/stumpings	15/–	0/–
- Source: Cricinfo, 17 June 2023

William Harvey Buckle (born 3 June 1943) is a former Australian cricketer. He played in 23 first-class matches for Queensland between 1963 and 1972.

Buckle's highest first-class score was 207, which he made in his only match in the 1964–65 Sheffield Shield, against Western Australia in Brisbane. He scored his other first-class century in the corresponding fixture the next season, when he made 31 and 112. In December 1966 against Victoria, he injured his hand, which was in plaster when he went out to bat in the second innings at the fall of the seventh wicket. In a successful attempt to save the match, he and Keith Ziebell put on an unbroken partnership of 77 before the match finished in a draw; he made 18 not out.

Buckle founded, owned and ran the Greg Chappell Cricket Centre in Brisbane between the mid-1970s and 1998, when he retired.

He should not be confused with Bill Buckle (1926–2023), the Australian automobile industry figure who designed the Goggomobil Dart.
