= Holden Dealer Racing Team =

Motor racing team

The Holden Dealer Racing Team (HDRT) was an Australian motor racing team, covertly backed by Holden through its dealer network so as to get around General Motors's worldwide ban on the company being involved in motorsport. The HDRT contested the 1968 Bathurst 500 endurance race at the Mount Panorama Circuit, Bathurst, as well as the 1968 London-Sydney Marathon using Holden's latest car, the Holden Monaro HK.

Although short-lived, this team was significant as the precursor to a permanent Holden Dealer Team set up the following year which then played a dominant role in Australian touring car racing over the next two decades.

== 1968 London–Sydney Marathon ==
In early 1968, the Holden Dealer Racing Team was set up by David McKay, who already ran the Scuderia Veloce race team in various forms of motor sport in Australia. A motoring journalist with the Daily Telegraph and Sunday Telegraph newspapers in Sydney, McKay learned of the upcoming London–Sydney Marathon which was sponsored by race organiser Sir Max Aitken and his UK newspaper, the Daily Express. The marathon would begin on 24 November in Crystal Palace, London, and finish on 18 December at the Warwick Farm Raceway in Sydney.

McKay convinced his own editor David McNicoll and Telegraph owner Frank Packer to get involved in the event, which they did with co-sponsorship. McKay also convinced Holden to get involved by supplying him with three of the yet to be released Holden Monaros in which to run in the event. Contrary to popular belief at the time, the Monaros were actually prepared for the 7,000 mile marathon that would travel through eleven countries by Holden under the supervision of its Sales Director John Bagshaw and chief engineer Bill Steinhagen, and not by Scuderia Veloce. Also, the cars would not be entered under the name of Scuderia Veloce or the Holden Dealer Racing Team, but instead were entered in the event under the name of their major sponsor, The Sydney Telegraph, with the words "Sydney Telegraph Racing" prominently painted on the side of the cars.

While the team did not feature strongly in the results due to mechanical woes, the team's second car driven by leading Australian Rally Championship driver Barry Ferguson finished 12th outright, while the 3rd car driven by triple Australian Grand Prix winner Doug Whiteford finished 14th. The Monaro driven by team leader David McKay failed to finish the marathon. McKay's Monaro was rolled over while competing a rally section near Broken Hill, hospitalising one of the crew. This disqualified it from the rally. A new windscreen was fitted and was driven straight to Sydney allowing McKay to watch the finish.

== 1968 Bathurst 500 ==
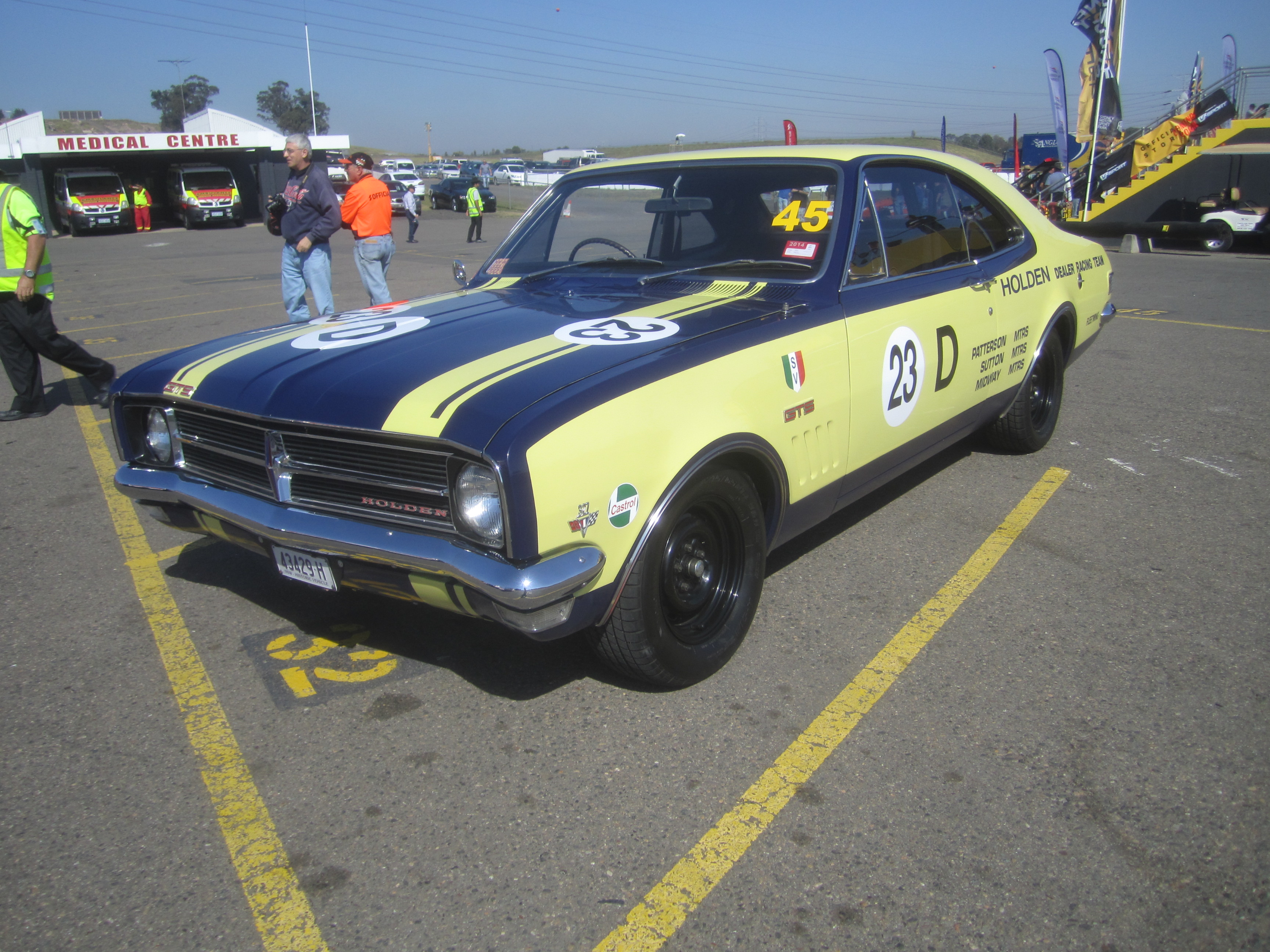
The Holden Dealer Racing Team's #23D HK Monaro GTS327 of Paul Hawkins and Bill Brown at Sydney Motorsport Park in 2013

The day following the official launch of the Monaro on the Gold Coast, prominent Melbourne based Holden dealer and former racer Bill Patterson reportedly asked McKay (who was on the Gold Coast covering the cars launch) what it would cost to run three of the new Holden Monaro GTS327s in the 1968 Bathurst 500 at Mount Panorama for Group E Series Production Touring Cars. This led to an agreement being reached where McKay's Scuderia Veloce team, under the name Holden Dealer Racing Team, would run three Monaros which were separately financed by three different Holden dealers, Patterson Motors (Victoria), Midway Motors (Queensland) and Sutton Motors (New South Wales), with each dealer named on all three cars. The Monaros (not, as rumour had it, the London-Sydney cars) were delivered to the team's base in Wahroonga on Sydney's Upper North Shore where they were prepared by Scuderia Veloce chief mechanic Bob Atkins.

Car #23D was driven by international sports car and Formula One racer Paul Hawkins and Bill Brown, #24D was driven by New Zealander Jim Palmer (a Tasman Series regular) and Phil West, while car #25D was driven by 1964 Armstrong 500 winner George Reynolds and veteran touring and sports car driver Brian Muir.

The race was won by the privately entered Monaro of Bruce McPhee and Barry Mulholland. The Palmer/West Monaro finished second outright, with the Muir/Reynolds car in fifth, while the Hawkins/Brown car was disqualified for receiving outside assistance after breaking a wheel in The Cutting. Palmer and West had actually finished 3rd on the road, but the 2nd placed Des West / Ron Marks Monaro was disqualified in post-race scrutineering, lifting the HDRT car to second place.

It was not until the 1969 Datsun Three Hour at Sandown that a permanent Holden Dealer Team, managed by Harry Firth, had its first outing. None of the six Holden Dealer Racing Team drivers from 1968, nor David McKay or Scuderia Veloce were involved in Firth's 1969 Holden Dealer Team campaign.
