= George Reynolds (racing driver) =

This is about the Australian racing driver. For similar names see the disambiguation page George Reynolds (disambiguation)

Haldane George Reynolds (8 May 1928 – 2 March 2012) was an Australian racing driver.

The career of Reynolds, who was born on 8 May 1928, extended from the late 1950s into the late 1960s. Known primarily as a touring car and sports car driver, Reynolds won Class D of the 1962 Armstrong 500 at Phillip Island, sharing a Volkswagen with Jim McKeown.

However, Reynolds is best known as outright winner (although outright winners were not officially acknowledged at the time) of the Armstrong 500, now held at Bathurst, in 1964. With three time winning partners Bob Jane and Harry Firth split amongst the entries of the factory supported Ford touring car team both Jane and Firth needed co-drivers for the 500-mile classic. Reynolds was paired with Jane and assisted Jane to his fourth consecutive Bathurst victory.

Reynolds was later one of a group of drivers who raced for David McKay's Scuderia Veloce team. He continued to race at the front rank of Australian drivers into the late 1960s, taking a top-ten finish at the 1968 Surfers Paradise 6 Hour driving a Ferrari with Phil West as well as a top five finish at the 1968 Hardie-Ferodo 500 co-driving a Holden Dealer Racing Team Holden Monaro with Brian Muir, both times in entries fielded by Scuderia Veloce.

Reynolds died on 2 March 2012.

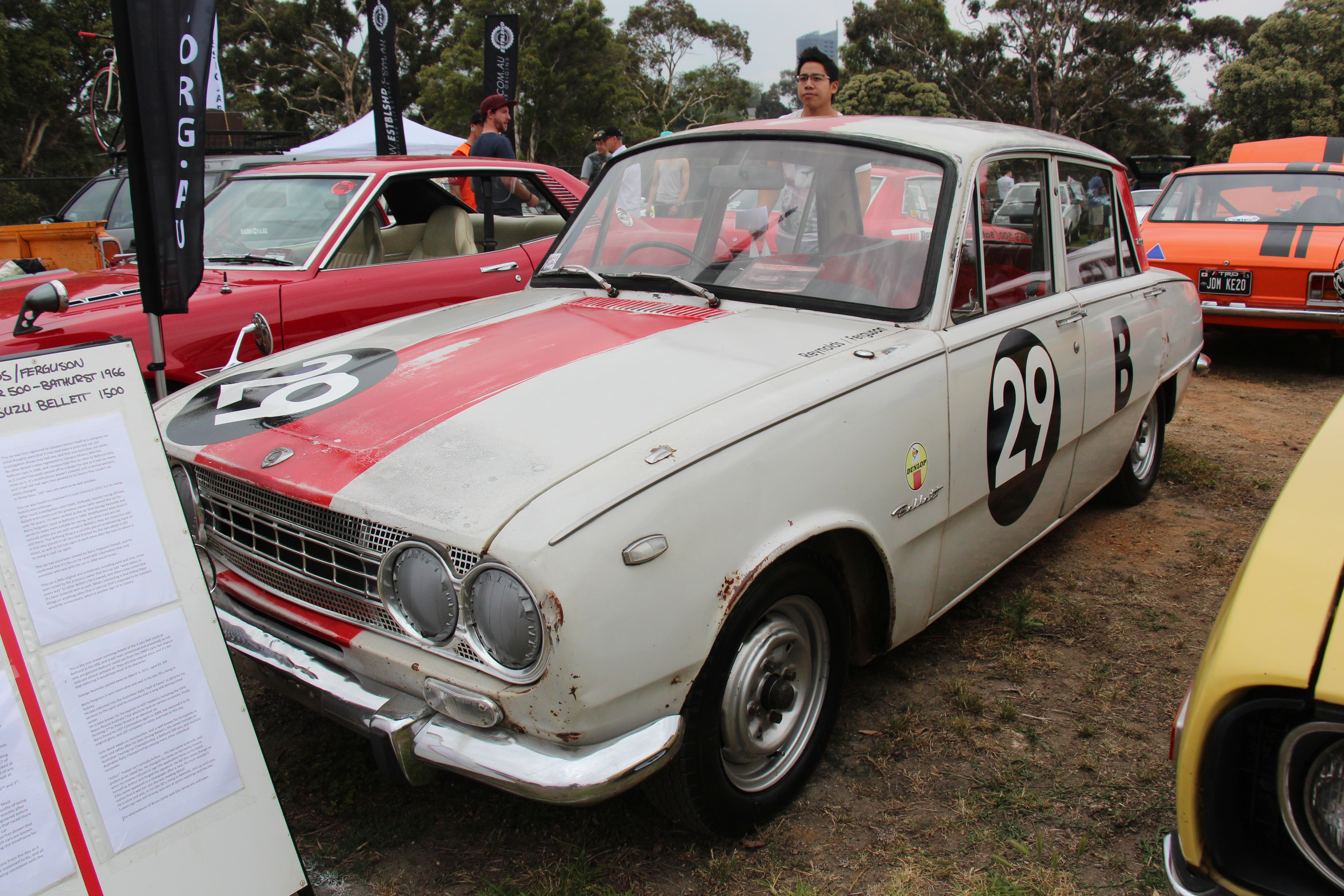
Reynolds and Barry Ferguson placed fifth in Class B in the 1966 Gallaher 500 driving this Isuzu Bellett. The car is pictured in 2015

Sporting positions
Preceded by Bob Jane; Harry Firth	Winner of the Bathurst 500; 1964 (with Bob Jane)	Succeeded by Barry Seton; Midge Bosworth
