= Ford Falcon (XR) =

Australian full-size car

Ford Falcon (XR) Ford Fairmont (XR)
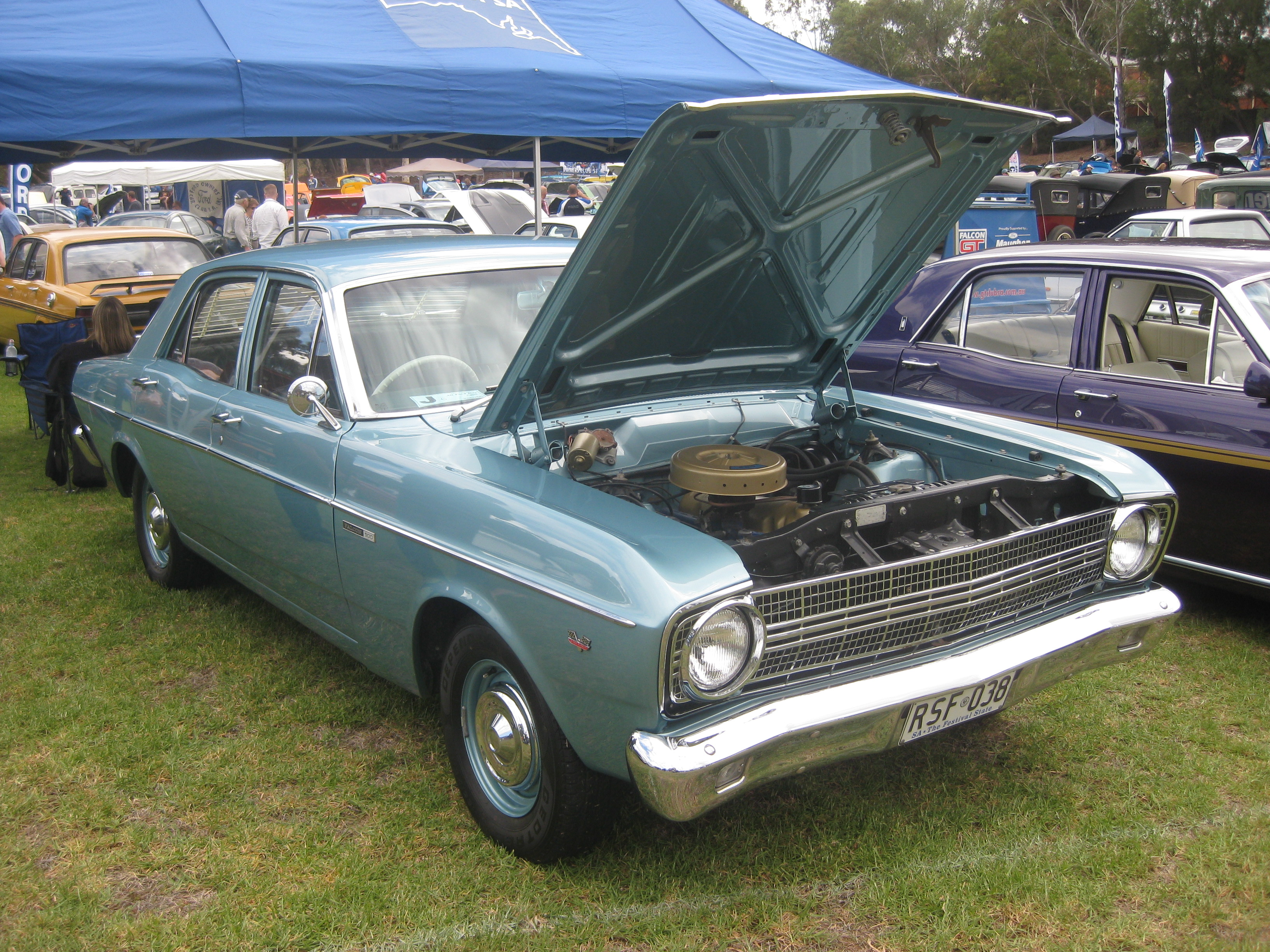
- Ford Falcon 500 Sedan (XR)

Overview
- Manufacturer: Ford Australia
- Production: September 1966 – March 1968

Body and chassis
- Class: Full-size car
- Body style: 4-door sedan 5-door station wagon 2-door coupe utility 2-door panel van
- Related: Ford Fairlane (ZA)

Powertrain
- Engine: 170 ci (2.8 L) Inline 6; 200 ci (3.3 L) Inline 6; 289 ci (4.7 L) "Windsor" V8
- Transmission: 3-speed manual 3-speed automatic 3-speed Cruis-O-Matic/4-speed manual(GT only)

Dimensions
- Length: 4,689 mm (184.6 in)
- Width: 1,875 mm (73.8 in)
- Height: 1,389 mm (54.7 in)
- Kerb weight: 1,333 kg (2,938.8 lb)

Chronology
- Predecessor: Ford Falcon (XP)
- Successor: Ford Falcon (XT)

The Ford Falcon (XR) is a full-sized car produced by Ford Australia from 1966 to 1968. It was the first of the second generation of the Falcon and also included the Ford Fairmont (XR), the luxury-oriented version.

== Overview ==
The XR series was introduced in September 1966. Styling was based on the third-generation 1966 US Ford Falcon, and it was promoted as the "Mustang-bred Falcon". It was the first Australian Falcon to be offered with a V8 engine, the 200 bhp (149 kW), 289 cubic inch (4.7 L) Windsor unit. The XR marked the first time a V8 engine could be optioned in all trim levels of an Australian car, V8s having previously been reserved for the more upmarket variants. The 144 cubic inch (2.4 L) six-cylinder engine was deleted for the XR series, leaving the 170 cubic inch (2.8 L) six as the base Falcon engine. A 200 cubic inch (3.3 L) six was also available, along with a 200ci "Super Pursuit" motor.

The XR series was initially offered in 9 different models: Falcon, Falcon 500, and Fairmont sedans, Falcon, Falcon 500, and Fairmont wagons, Falcon and Falcon 500 utilities, and the Falcon Van. The new wagons shared the 111-inch (2,800 mm) wheelbase with the XR sedans, unlike the 1966 US Falcon wagons which featured a 115-inch (2,900 mm) wheelbase. The Falcon 500 replaced the Falcon Deluxe of the XP series and the two-door hardtop body style available in the XP series was not offered in the XR range.

The Falcon XR won the Wheels Car of the Year award in 1966, giving the Ford Falcon two straight wins.

The Falcon XR was the first Falcon to be assembled at the Ford New Zealand assembly plant at Seaview, the previous XL, XM and XP models being previously imported fully built up from Australia, essentially only in station wagon form.

=== Falcon GT ===
The marketing focus on the Falcon's relationship with the Mustang's sporty appeal led to Ford introducing a Falcon GT variant of the XR in 1967, featuring a 225 bhp (168 kW) version of the 289 cubic inch (4.7 L) Windsor V8 engine, sourced from the Ford Mustang. The GT heralded the dawn of the Aussie muscle car. All of the original XR GTs were painted in the colour GT Gold, except for eight that were Gallaher Silver and another five that were Russet Bronze, Sultan Maroon, Polar White, Avis White and Ivy Green. The non-gold GTs, while having the same specifications, are the rarest of the early Australian muscle cars.

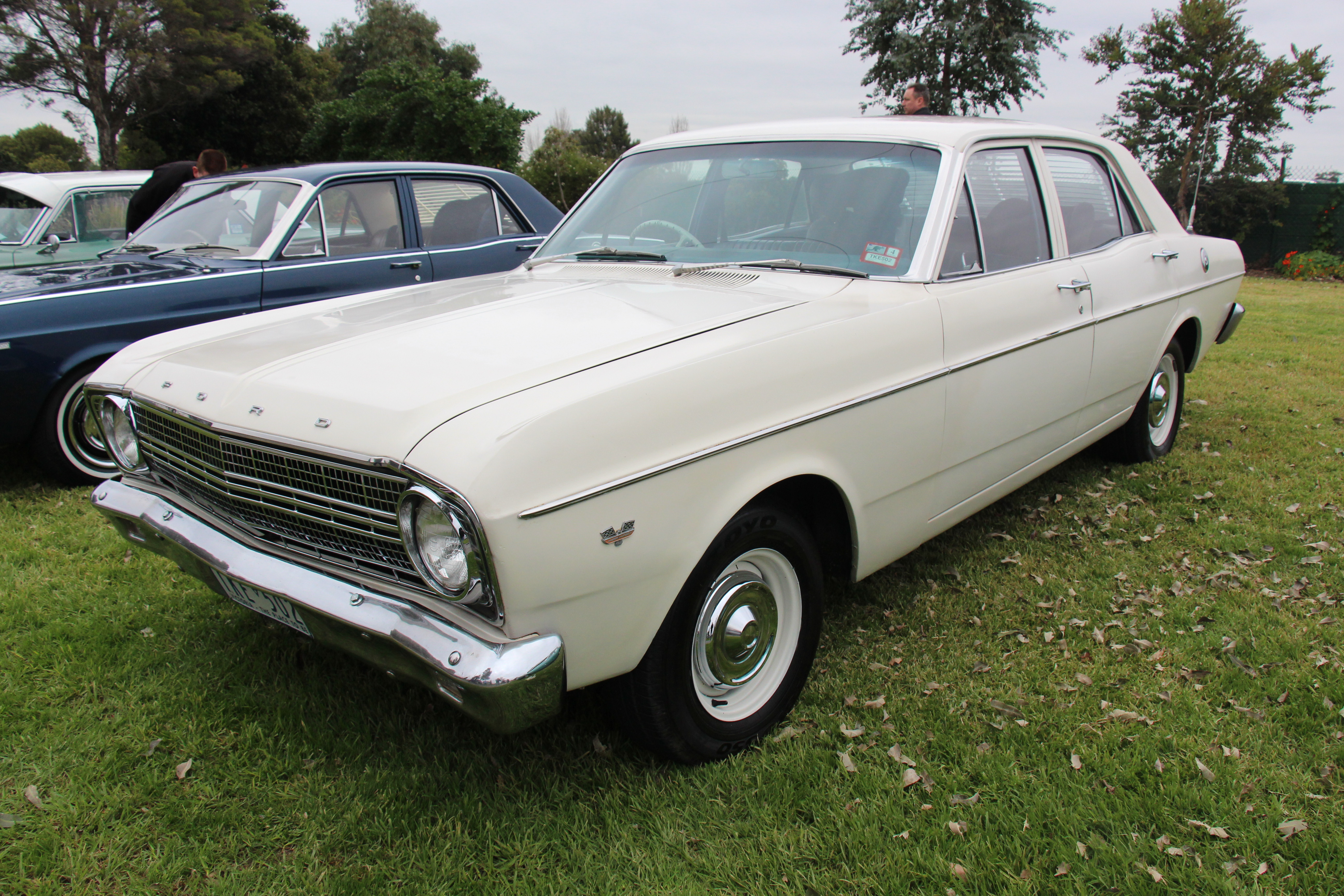
Ford XR Falcon sedan

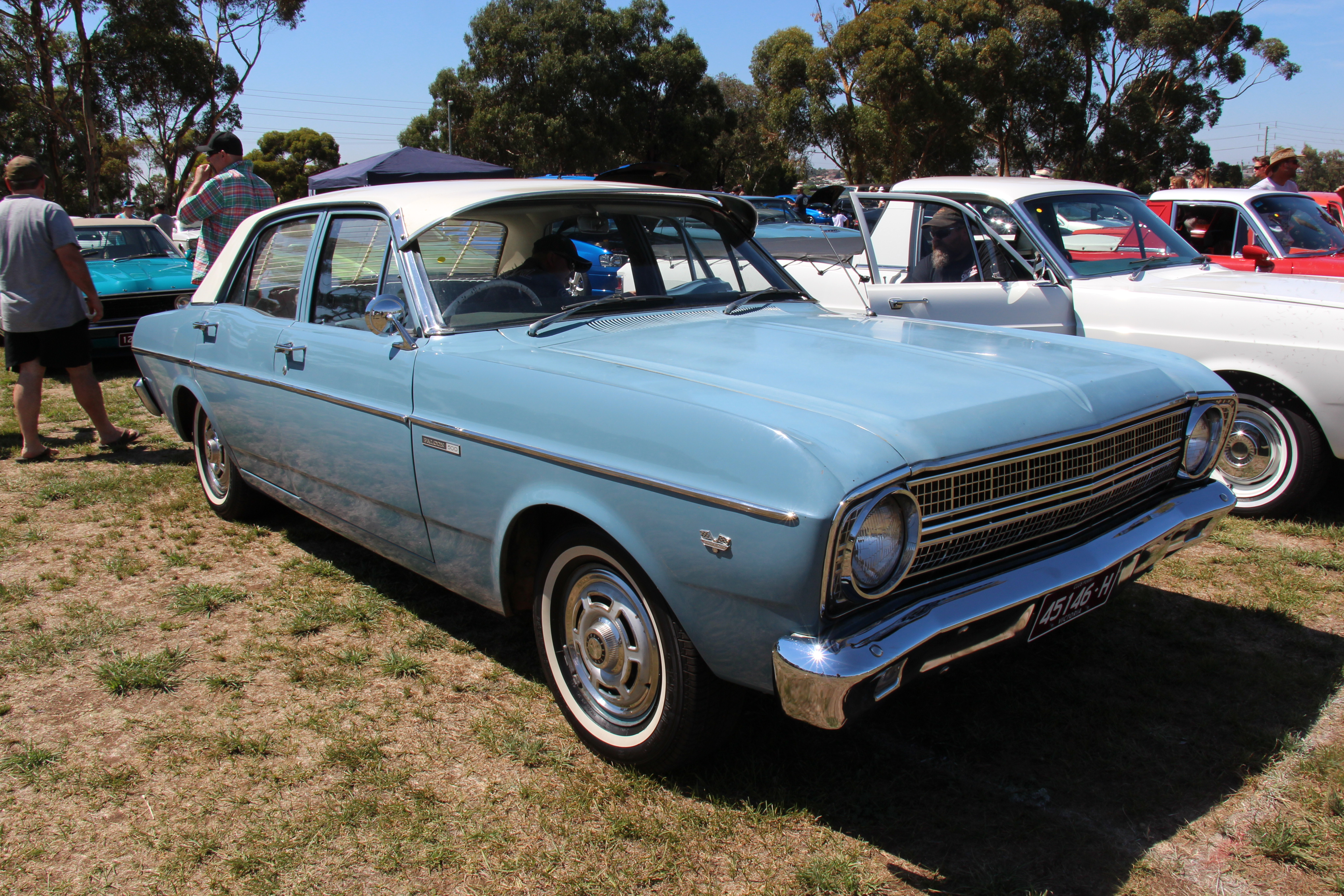
Ford XR Falcon 500 sedan (with optional Deluxe wheel covers)

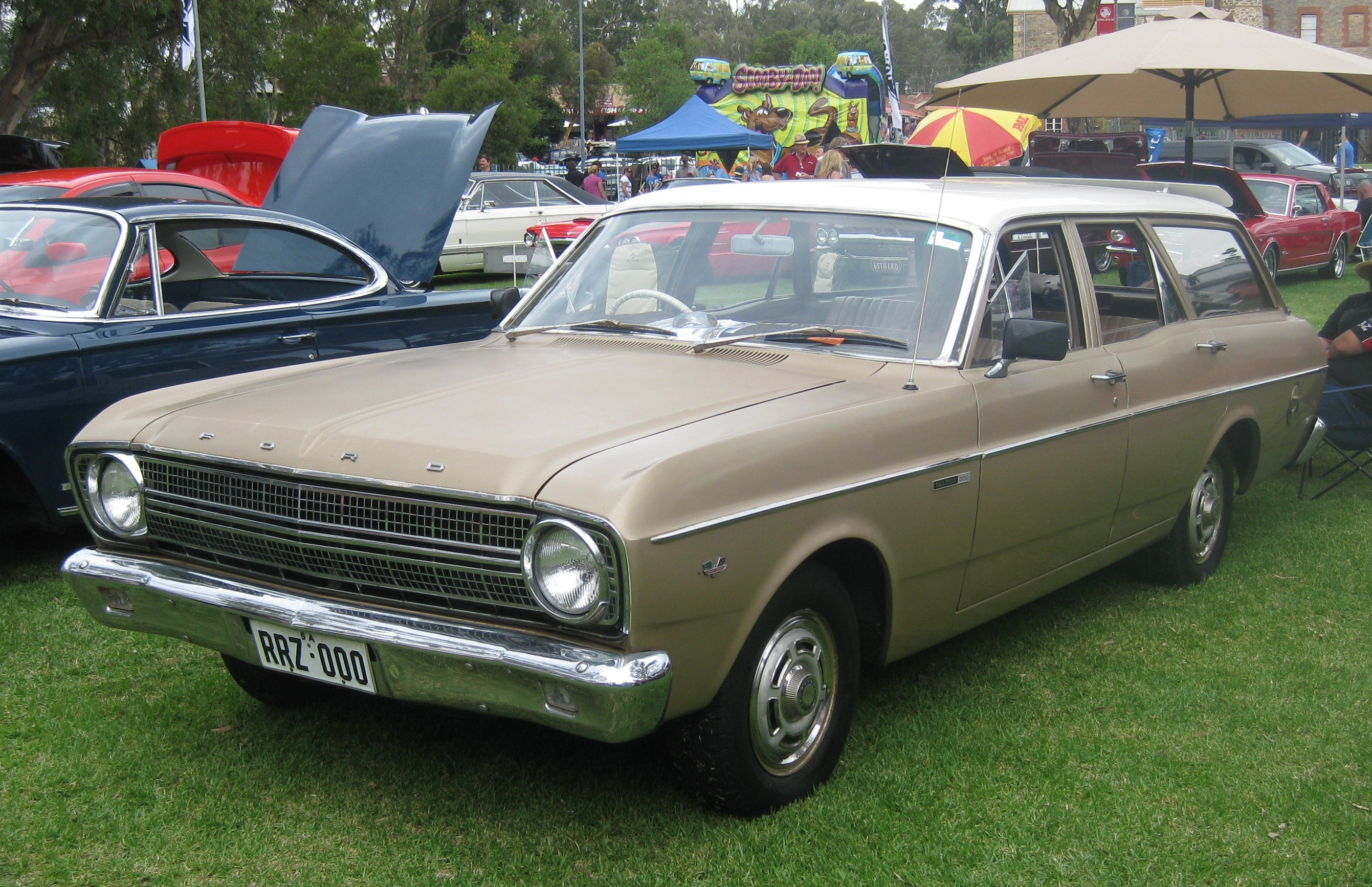
Ford XR Falcon 500 wagon (with optional Deluxe wheel covers)

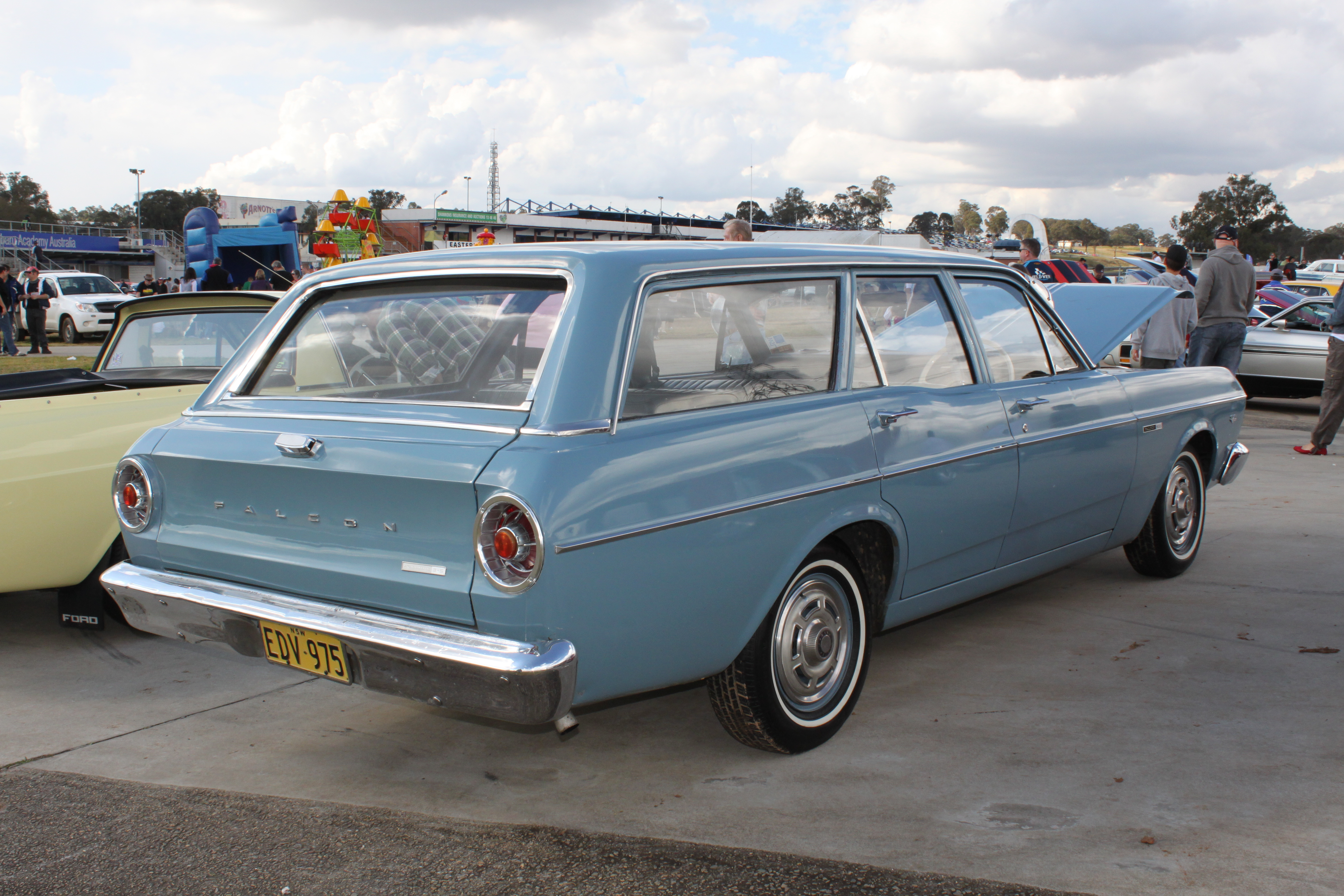
Ford XR Falcon 500 wagon (with optional Deluxe wheel covers)

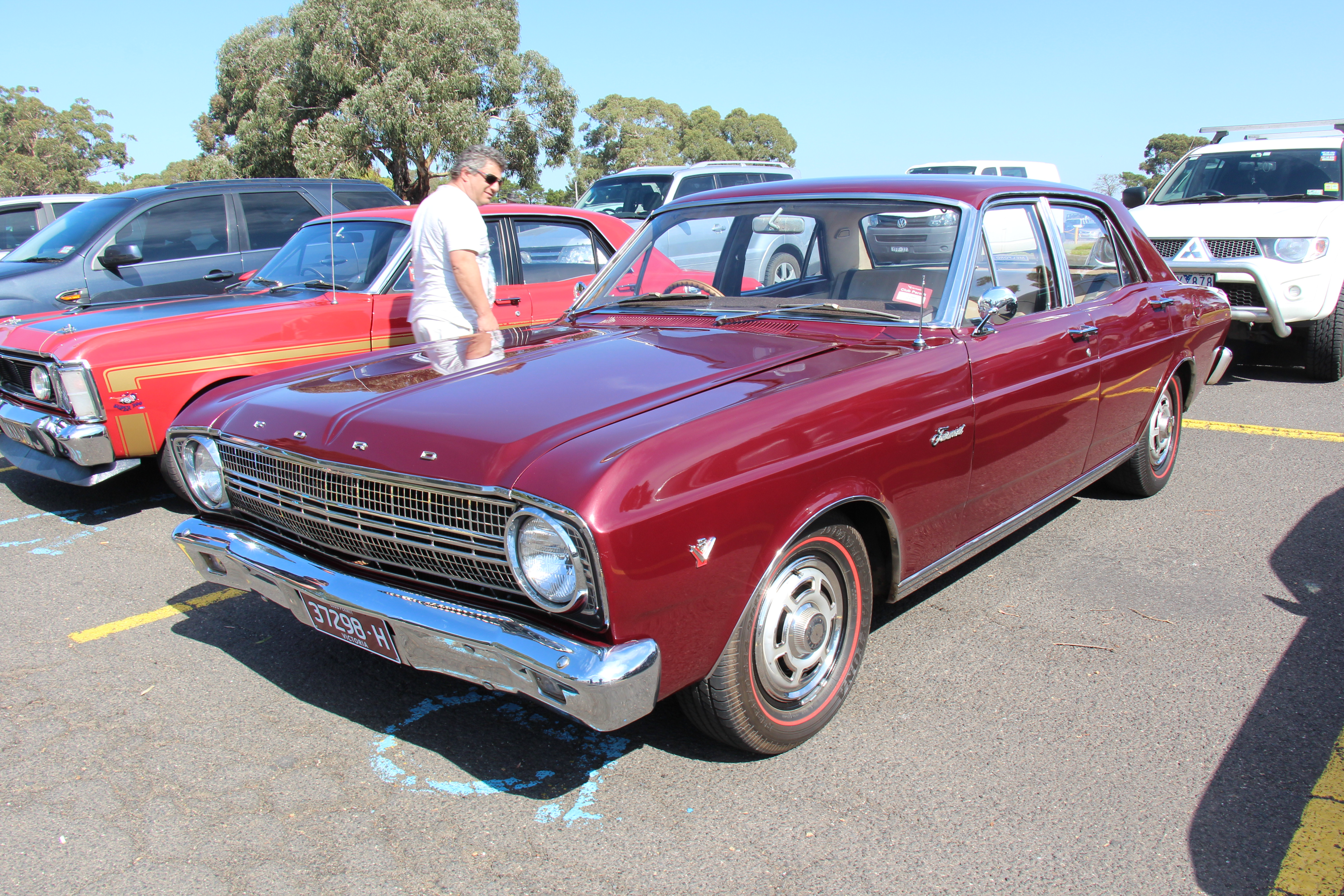
Ford XR Fairmont sedan

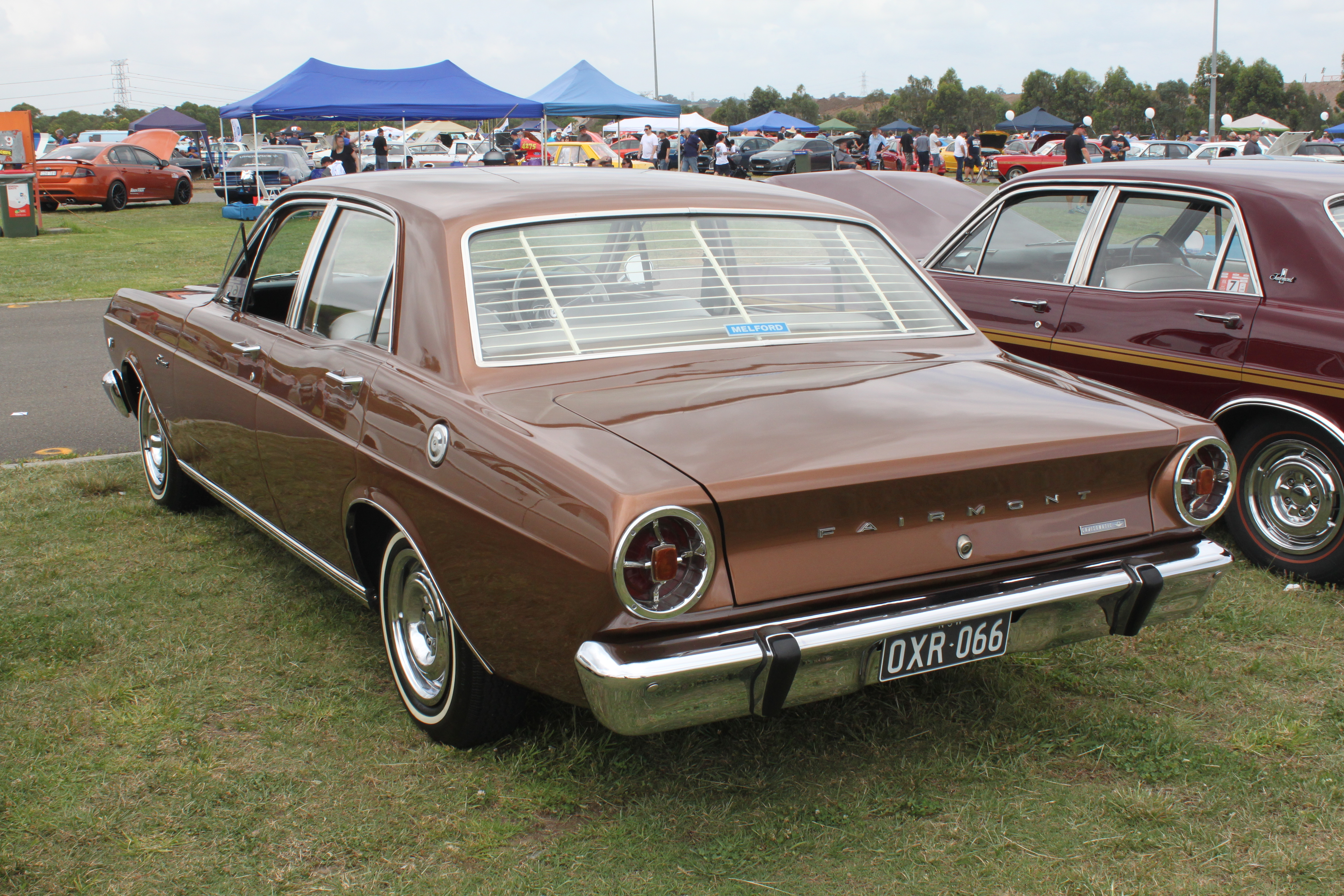
Ford XR Fairmont sedan (with GT wheel covers)

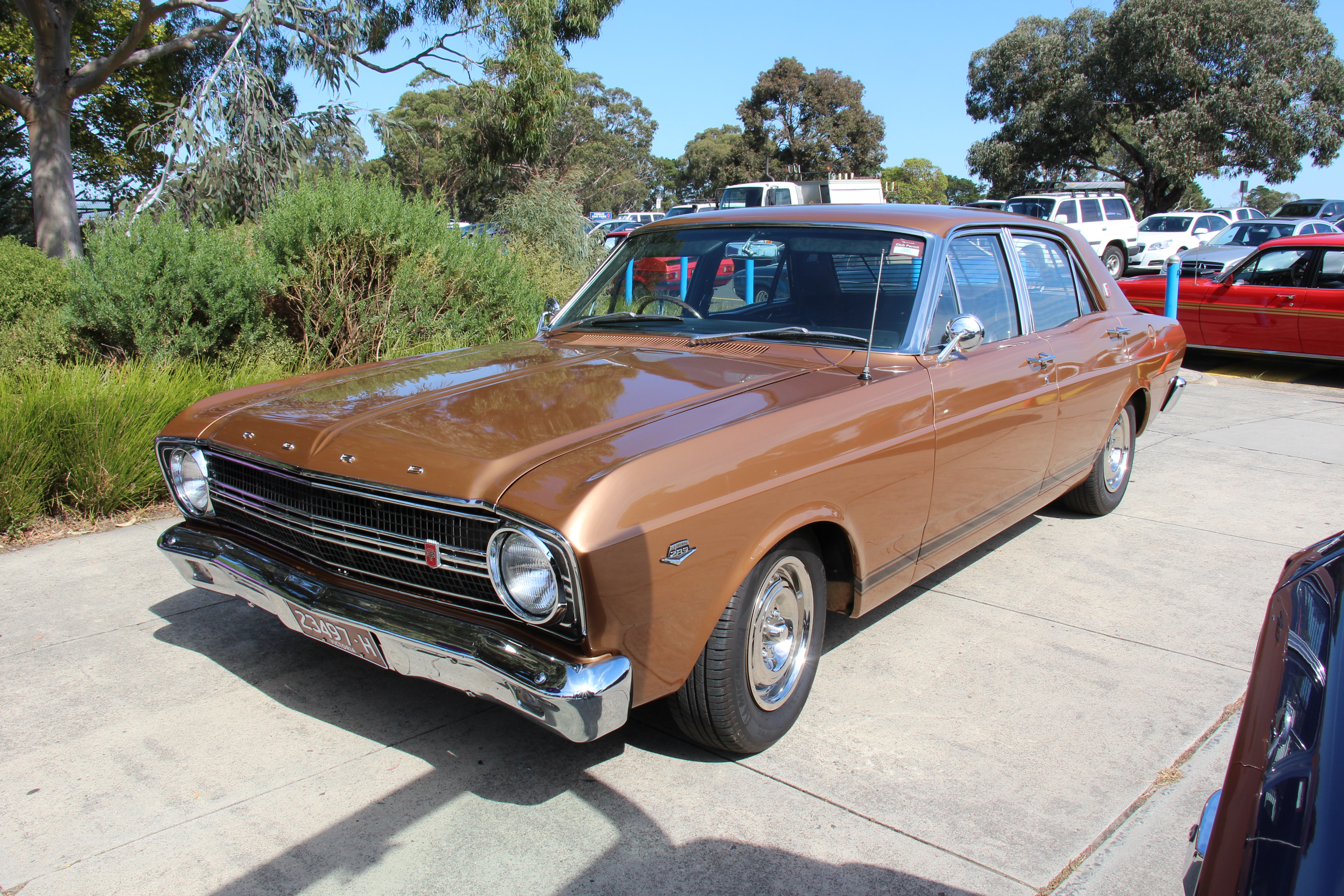
Ford XR Falcon GT sedan

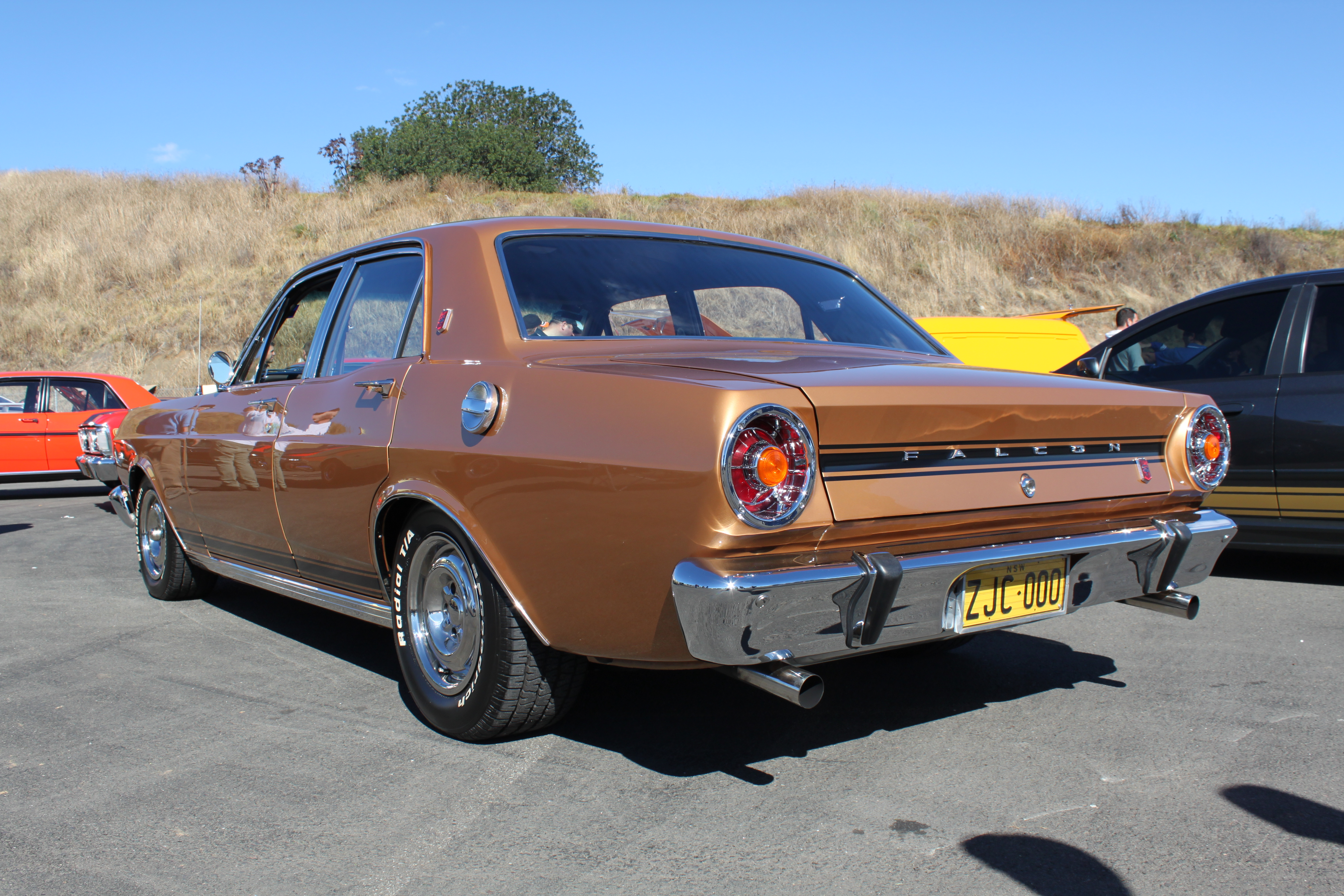
Ford XR Falcon GT sedan

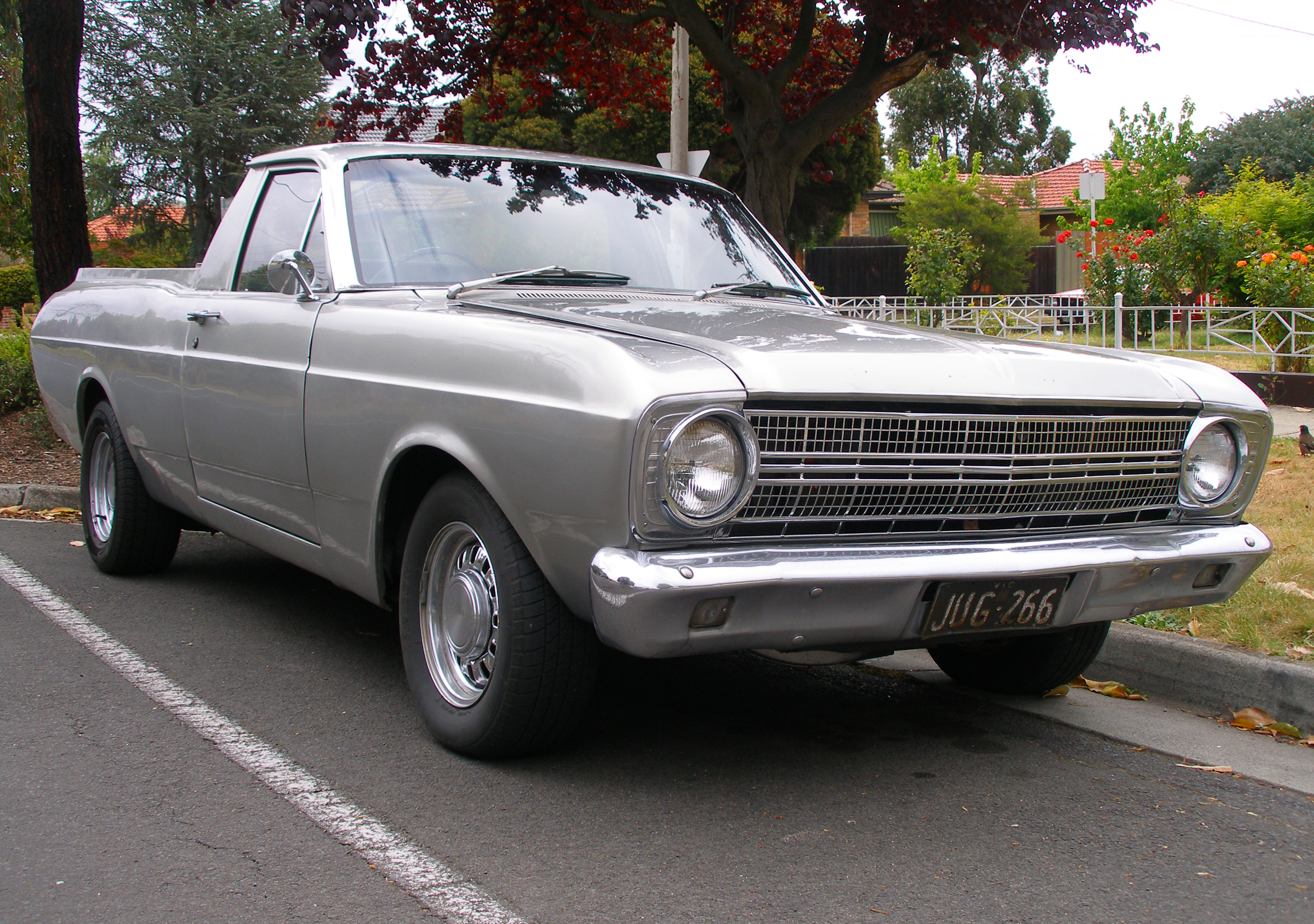
Ford XR Falcon utility (with non-standard wheels)

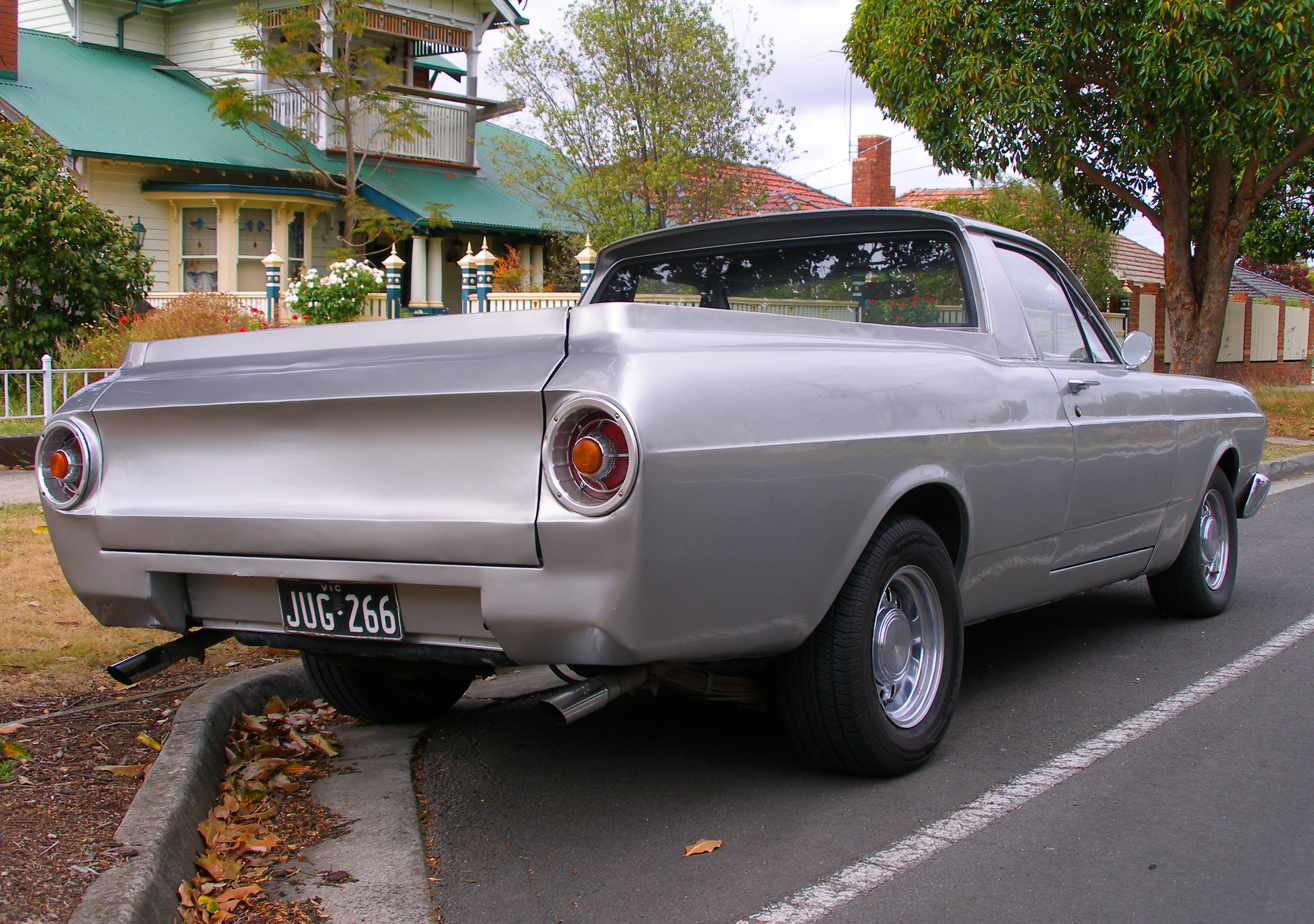
Ford XR Falcon utility (with non-standard wheels)

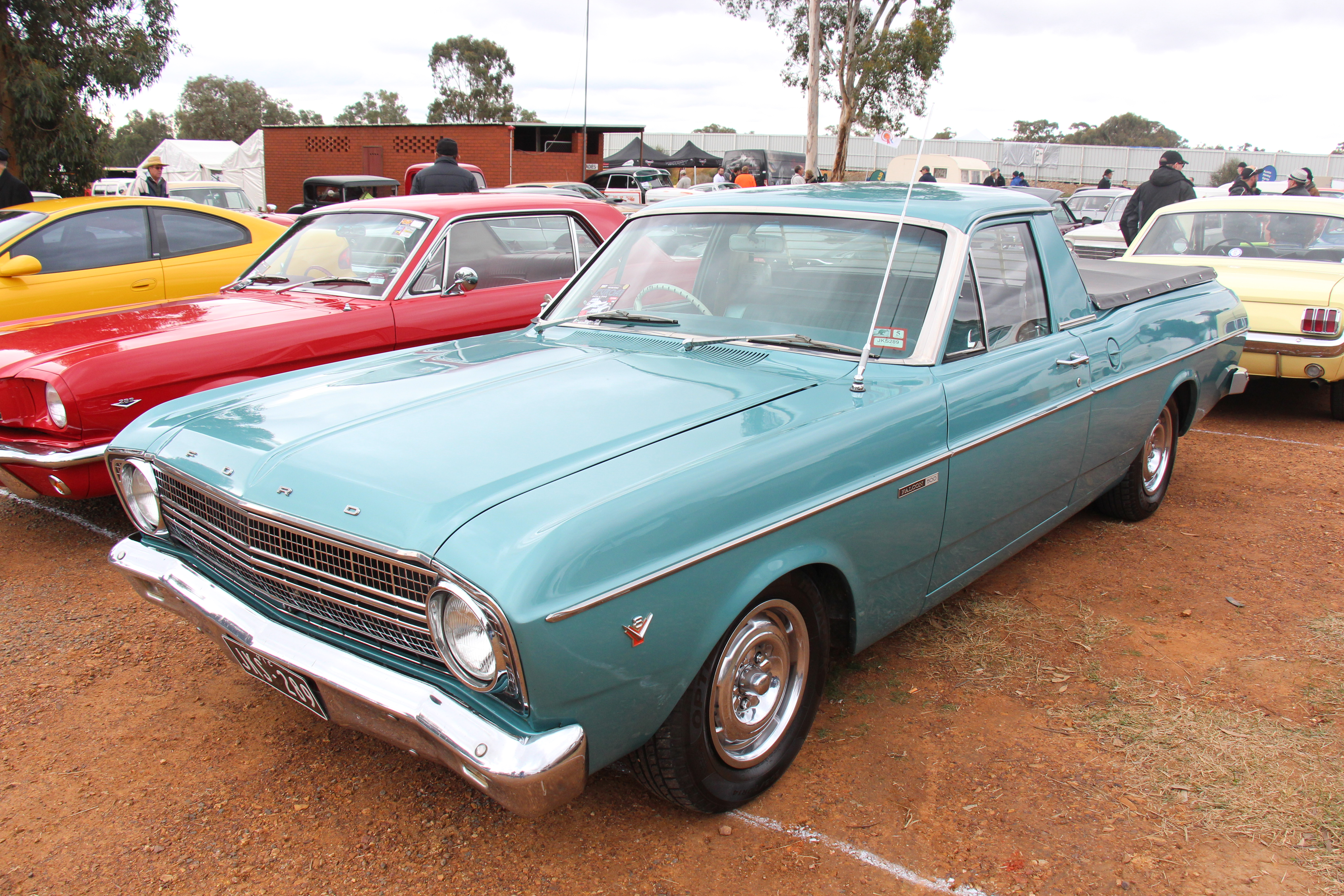
Ford XR Falcon 500 utility (with non-standard wheels)

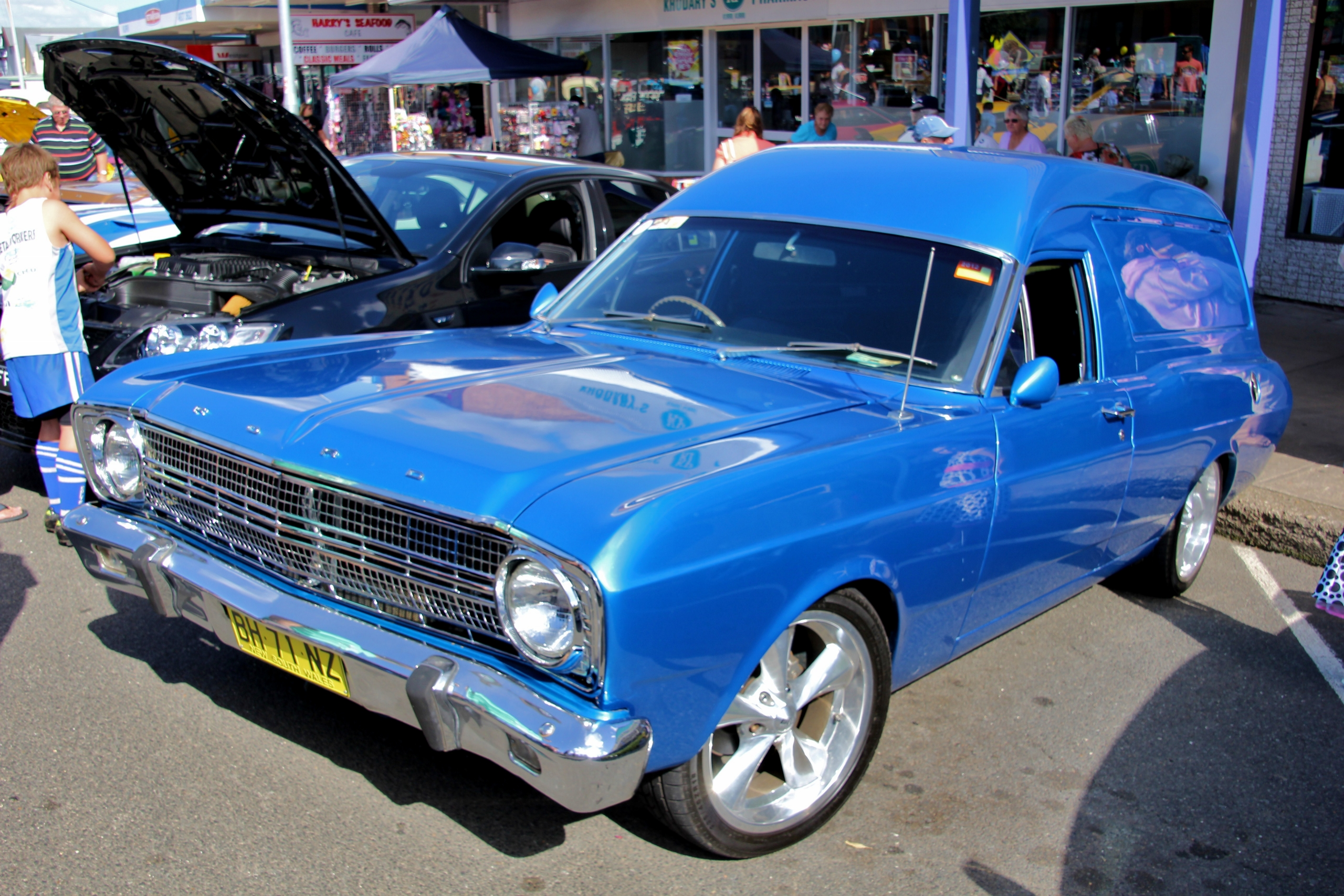
Ford XR Falcon panel van (with non-standard wheels)

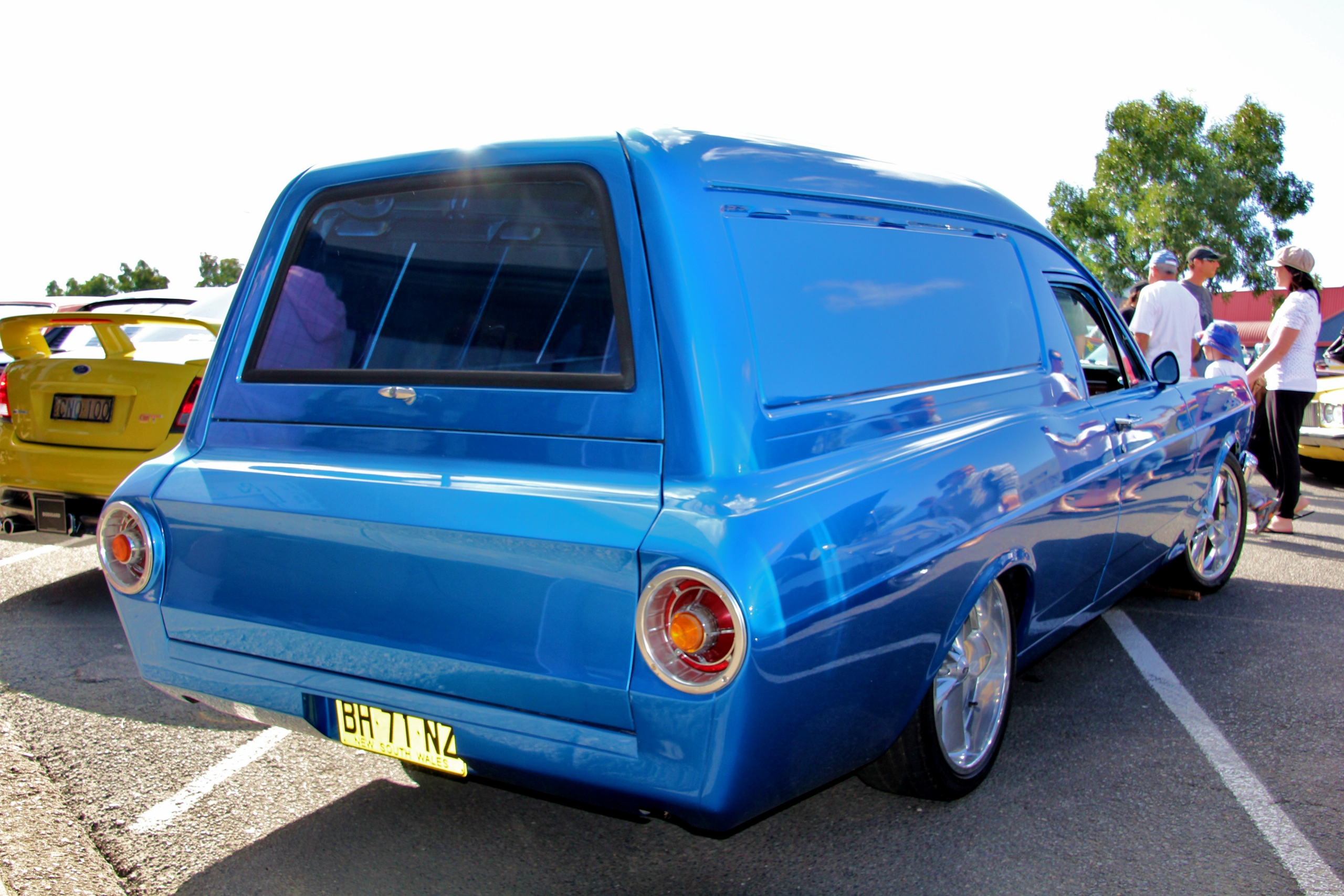
Ford XR Falcon panel van (with non-standard wheels)

== Motorsport ==
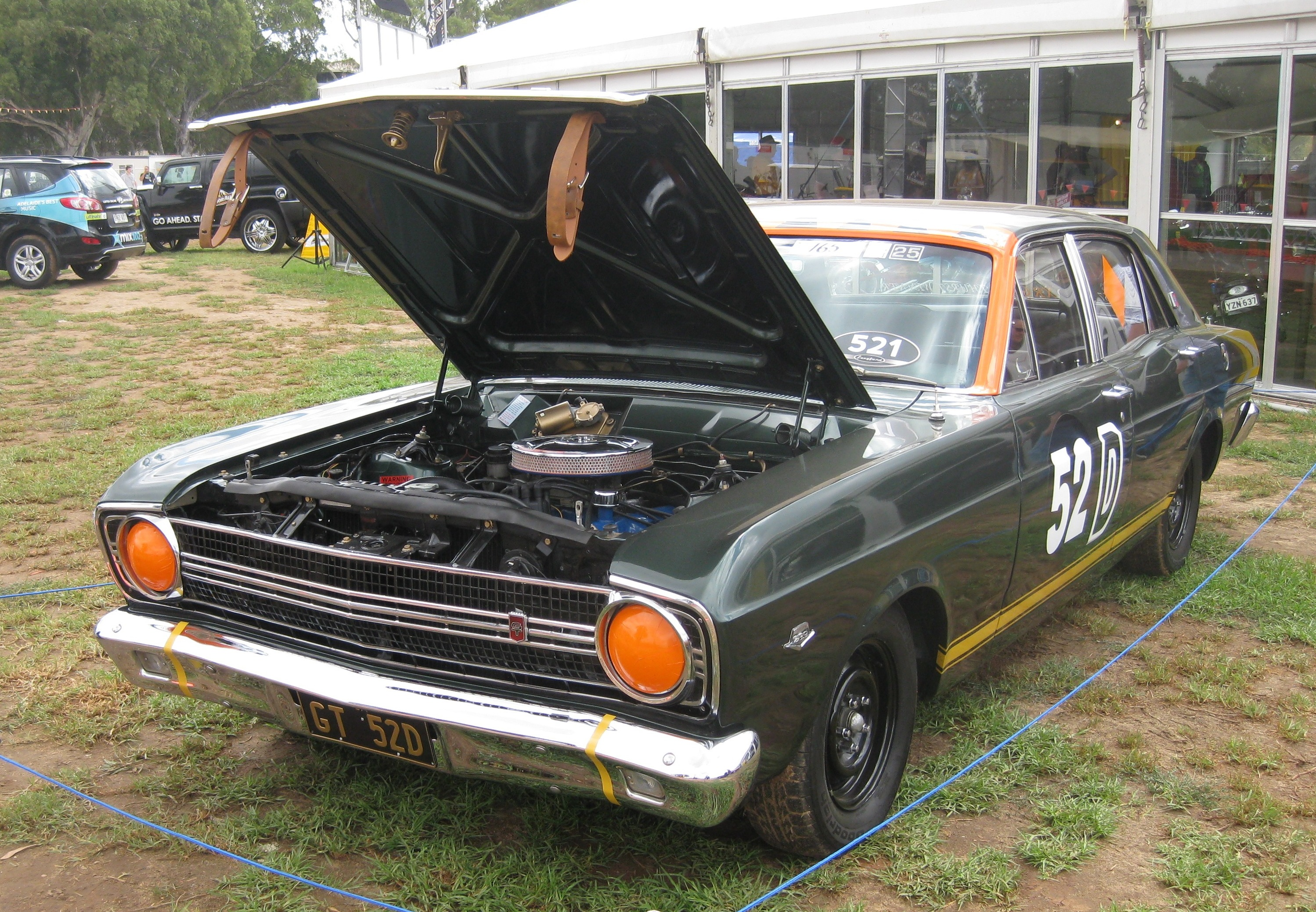
A "race replica" of the XR Falcon GT which won the 1967 Gallaher 500

Ford Works Team manager/driver Harry Firth, and a young Fred Gibson won the 1967 Gallaher 500 at the Mount Panorama Circuit in Bathurst driving an XR Falcon GT. Firth and Gibson won the race by 11 seconds from their Sydney-based teammates Ian and Leo Geoghegan. The Geoghegan Falcon was initially flagged in first, but a protest from Firth resulted in a recount of laps and the win being awarded to Firth and Gibson.

With the Falcon powered by a 289-cubic-inch Ford V8 engine, it was the first ever Bathurst 500/1000 won by a V8-powered car. Prior to 1967, the Mount Panorama Circuit had been regarded as too tough on the larger V8 cars (primarily the Studebaker Lark), and had been the domain of smaller cars such as the Morris Cooper S and Ford's own Cortina GT500.
