= George Reynolds (Medal of Honor) =

American union army soldier (1839–1889)

- Civil War era Army Medal of Honor
- Born: 1839; Ireland
- Died: March 16, 1889 (aged 49–50); Manhattan, New York City, New York
- Burial place: Cemetery of the Evergreens
- Military career
- Allegiance: United States of America; Union
- Branch: United States Army; Union Army
- Service years: 1861 - 1864
- Rank: Private
- Units: (New York (state)) Company M, 9th New York Volunteer Cavalry Regiment
- Conflicts: American Civil War • Battle of Opequon
- Awards: Medal of Honor

George Reynolds (1839 - March 16, 1889) was a Union Army soldier during the American Civil War. He received the Medal of Honor for gallantry during the Battle of Opequon more commonly called the Third Battle of Winchester, Virginia on September 19, 1864.

== Biography ==
Reynolds was born in Ireland in 1839. He enlisted in the US Army from New York City in October 1861, and mustered out in October 1864.

After the war, he went on to study art under the great American painter Thomas Eakins and was a member of The Art Students' League of Philadelphia. He was included in several Eakins paintings and pioneering photographs. He was the subject of a famous portrait by Eakins, "The Veteran," now in the collection of Yale University.

== Medal of Honor citation ==
“The President of the United States of America, in the name of Congress, takes pleasure in presenting the Medal of Honor to Private George Reynolds, United States Army, for extraordinary heroism on 19 September 1864, while serving with Company M, 9th New York Cavalry, in action at Winchester, Virginia, for capture of Virginia State flag.”

== See also ==
- List of Medal of Honor recipients
- List of American Civil War Medal of Honor recipients: Q-S
