= Keith Ziebell =

Australian cricketer (born 1942)

Personal information
- Full name: Keith Percy Ziebell
- Born: 26 July 1942 (age 84); Rosewood, Queensland, Australia
- Batting: Right-handed
- Bowling: Right-arm medium

Domestic team information
- Years: Team
- 1965/66–1966/67: Queensland

Career statistics
Competition	First-class
Matches	9
Runs scored	506
Batting average	36.14
100s/50s	1/2
Top score	212 not out
Balls bowled	248
Wickets	2
Bowling average	59.50
5 wickets in innings	0
10 wickets in match	0
Best bowling	1/15
Catches/stumpings	14/–
- Source: ESPNcricinfo, 23 November 2023

Keith Percy Ziebell (born 26 July 1942) is a former Australian cricketer. He was a right-handed batsman and right-arm medium bowler. He played 9 first-class cricket matches for Queensland between 1965 and 1967, scoring 506 runs and taking 2 wickets.

The high point of Ziebell's first-class career came in the Sheffield Shield match against Victoria at the Melbourne Cricket Ground in December 1966. Queensland followed on 427 runs in arrears, but Ziebell, going to the wicket in the second innings late on the third day with the score at 3 for 152, took part in five successive partnerships of more than 50 to give Queensland the lead when the match ended in a draw. He batted throughout the fourth day and scored 212 not out.
