= Ford Falcon GT =

High-performance variant of the Ford Falcon

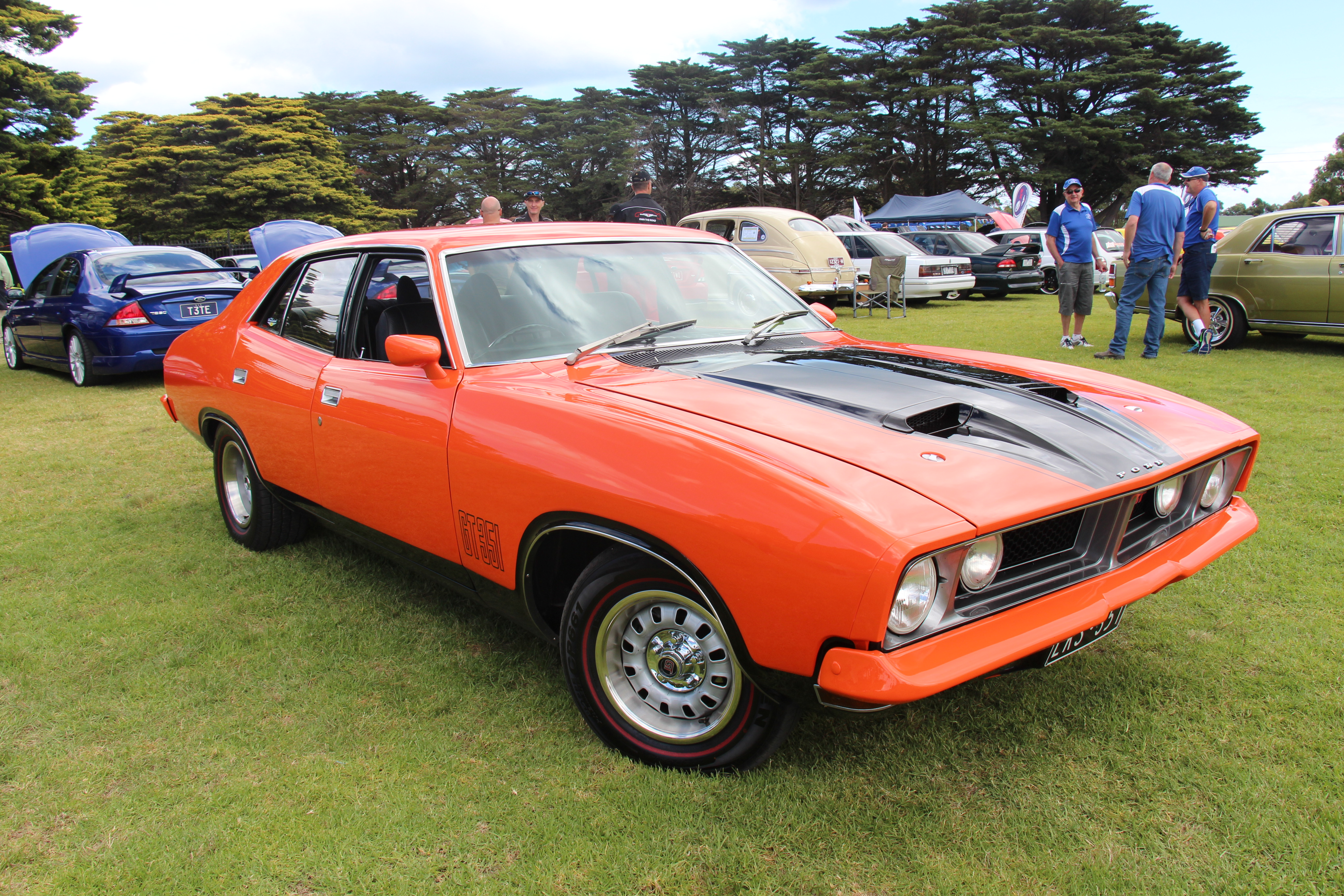
- Ford Falcon GT Sedan (XB)

Overview
- Manufacturer: Ford Australia; Tickford
- Model years: 1967–1976; 1992; 1997

Body and chassis
- Class: Sports sedan
- Layout: FR layout

The Ford Falcon GT is an automobile produced by Ford Australia from 1967 until 1976 as the performance version of its Falcon model range. Its production was resumed by a joint venture in 1992 and 1997 with Tickford, and then again between 2003 and 2014 with Prodrive, the latter being marketed as the FPV GT & GT-P. The Falcon GT is inextricably linked with the history of Australian sports sedan car production and with the evolution of Australian motor racing.The Falcon GT lineage includes many Bathurst wins and motorsport accolades over its entire production run.

== Overview ==
The GT model was introduced as a performance variant of the Australian Ford Falcon XR series in 1967. They were also offered with the 1968 XT; 1969 XW, 1971 XY, 1972 XA, 1973 XB Falcon ranges. GT-HO ("Handling Option") versions were released with the XW and XY Falcon series, with were essentially further modified homologation specials for motor racing. An XA series HO was abandoned in the early stage of development due to public pressure in 1972 after an infamous newspaper campaign against excessive top speed.

In 1992, after a 16-year absence since the last model, the badge resurfaced with the GT 25th Anniversary model based EB II series Falcon, which was followed by a GT 30th Anniversary model in 1997. Both of these cars were developed by Tickford Vehicle Engineering (TVE), which then opted to instead establish the Ford Tickford Experience (FTE) brand as a more sophisticated alternative to high performance rival, Holden Special Vehicles (HSV), by marketing the "T series" based on the AU Falcon and Fairlane range.

From 2003, with Tickford bought out by Prodrive, FTE was replaced by the new owner's Ford Performance Vehicles (FPV) joint venture with Ford Australia. This change led to the GT badge becoming a permanent fixture of the FPV range, with the aim of more closely competing against rival Holden's HSV. FPV's operations ended in 2014, as part of Ford Australia's end of location production by 2016, with the launch of the last GT-F "351".

== XR series ==
The 1967 XR series was a major shift in the evolution of the Falcon, then still being adapted from its American counterpart for Australian release. The car was noticeably larger compared to the XP model range. For the first time, Ford Australia offered a V8 engine on the range, the 289-cubic-inch engine then in use on the Ford Mustang.

The financing by the Australian Police force for certain testing created an opportunity for Ford to take advantage of the option of the powerful V8 engine, with Ford producing the Police Interceptor Pack Falcon which the Falcon GT was built on. Two prototype Police interceptors were given to Victoria Police for evaluation, one for the Mobile Traffic Section, and the other for the Wireless patrol. Both were rejected. Modifications to engine performance and stiffer suspension were suggested and adapted the Falcon GT went into production with the police GT variant economically fitted with Falcon 500 external appearance. Australia Managing Director, Bill Bourke, then introduced the GT, based around the success of GT versions of the Ford Cortina. The Falcon GT would be marketed in the same way as the Cortina GT with the competition arm of Ford Australia preparing production racing cars to race at the Bathurst 500.

A charcoal interior consisting of unique designed seats that were not available on any other model Falcon, wood-grained steering wheel, dash, and matching gear knob with special Stewart-Warner instrumentation. This was in addition to lowering and firming the suspension by 5 cm (2.0 in). Shock absorbers were also upgraded which added to the sporty specification.

The XR GT was available to the public exclusively with a manual transmission and in the exclusive "GT Gold" paint, with a total of 596 units built. A fleet of eight units was produced in "Gallaher Silver" for promotion of the Gallaher tobacco brand, which had a small keyhole in the right-rear quarter panel under one of the taillights that activated an alarm system connected to the doors and boot. A further five units were also finished in a selection of colours at the request of teams to enter them in racing events, with the 1967 Gallaher 500 winning XR GT painted in Ivy Green.

The factory racing team, led by veteran driver/engineer Harry Firth entered two cars, one for himself and Fred Gibson and the other for the Geoghegan brothers, Ian and Leo, though both supplied their own pit crew and each 'team' prepared its own car. After a day-long battle against three Alfa Romeos at Bathurst in 1967, the team emerged with a 1–2 team victory (with Firth and Gibson winning by 11 seconds) which captured the public imagination and sales figures soared. The move forced General Motors-Holden and Chrysler Australia to respond with their own performance editions of their large sedan in 1968 when neither had such vehicles planned, beginning the era of the Australian Falcon GT legend.

== XT series ==
The XT Falcon had an increase in capacity of the Windsor V8 to 302 in^{3}. The colour range was also increased, and sales doubled the number of the previous range. The XT won the Teams Prize in the 1968 London-Sydney Marathon finishing third, fifth, and eighth in the event, against more rally-focused opposition.

== XW series ==
Ford introduced the HO (handling option —quite often erroneously referred to as "high output") package in the 1969 XW model range, creating a two-tier range, with the HO package essentially a road-registerable racing car for the leading production touring car teams to exploit. With the XW range, the Windsor V8 was now offered in a bigger 351 cubic-inch displacement, producing 290 bhp (216 kW; 294 PS) and 385 lb⋅ft (522 N⋅m) of torque.

=== GT-HO ===
The first GT-HO variant produced 300 bhp (224 kW; 304 PS) due to a larger carburetor, and changes to the camshaft and intake. Changes also were made to the suspension, including stiffer shock absorbers and springs and larger-diameter roll bars. Despite the changes made, at the 1969 Hardie-Ferodo 500 poor tyre performance meant that drivers had to pit regularly over the opposition. However, a privately entered XW GT-HO of Bruce McPhee and Barry Mulholland claimed second outright.

=== GT-HO Phase II ===
In 1970, the Cleveland V8 engine replaced the previous Windsor engines, the 351 cubic-inch Cleveland engine was first used in a small batch of Phase 1 specification XW GT's, these are retrospectively referred to as "Phase 1.5s". Ford modified the engine in the Phase II, with a larger carburetor (700cfm) over the Cleveland's original 600 cfm version. Allan Moffat claimed his first Bathurst win at the hands of a Phase II at the 1970 Hardie-Ferodo 500, with Bruce McPhee second, giving Ford Works Team a 1 - 2 finish.

== XY series ==
Almost a year after the release of the XY Falcon, Ford released the 1971 XY GT. Among the visual changes to the normal Falcon range, the XY received the "shaker scoop" ram-air intake from the 1969-70 Mach 1 Mustang. An XY GT starred in the Australian movie Running on Empty, as a GT-HO Phase III.

=== GT-HO Phase III ===
The homologation specials reached their zenith with the Ford Falcon GTHO Phase III in 1971, a car which Allan Moffat used to defeat all opposition in the 1971 Bathurst enduro and remained one of the fastest four-door production sedan in the world, Maserati QP was much faster until the introduction of the Lotus Carlton 19 years later, with a 6-cylinder engine.

A fear campaign against the homologation specials started with headlines of "160 MPH Street Cars Soon!" led to Ford dropping production with the planned Falcon GT HO Phase IV. For their own part, touring car racing regulations were altered, creating the 1973 Group C regulations, which allowed production cars to be modified for racing independently of the road-going cars, reducing pressure on manufacturers to put racing modifications into the road cars.

A Ford Falcon GTHO Phase III was the most expensive Australian vehicle sold at auction, selling for A$750,000. A previous sale had been for A$683,650.

== XA series ==
The GT model was continued with the new Australian-designed XA, and for the first time, the GT was available as a two-door hardtop. The GT received unique front fenders with dummy air vents on the leading edges, and a bonnet featuring NACA-style ducts. Purchasers were now offered a larger range of colour combinations, with the GT black-outs on the bonnet and lower edges of the car now available in silver.

=== GT-HO Phase IV ===
Ford developed the HO series further with the XA Falcon, and were ready to produce the Phase IV to homologate the car for Group E Series Production Touring Cars racing, including the 1972 Hardie-Ferodo 500. On Sunday, 25 June 1972, the front page of the Sun-Herald set off a chain of responses from the New South Wales Minister for Transport, Milton Morris, who called for the ban of these supercars just three days after the news article.

On Thursday 29 June, the Confederation of Australian Motor Sport (CAMS) announced that the end of the current Group E Series Production Touring Cars regulations, which would be replaced by new Group C regulations for 1973. Group C allowed modified versions of road cars to compete, removing the need for manufactures to develop road-going race specials.

The following Sunday, 2 July, Ford announced the cancellation of the Phase IV program. At this stage, one production car had been sent down the line, and three XA GT sedans were in various stages of construction to Phase IV specs at Ford Special Vehicles, Ford's internal race division. Only one of these cars was ever used in competition, with one sold to rally driver Bruce Hodgson, and eventually was destroyed in a crash in 1981. The car has since been rediscovered and is undergoing restoration. The other two are in the hands of collectors, with the Gibson car in Queensland, while the car intended for Allan Moffat is in Sydney and sold at auction for $2 million in 2018, setting a record for an Australian sport sedan car.

The sole production-plated car as the only legitimate Ford factory Phase 4 was not sold until the following year, by Jack Brabham Ford, to a Sydney, Australia-based owner, who then had the car resprayed from its original Calypso Green to Zircon Green. The car went through a number of owners until the current owner had the car restored to factory specifications, in a build documented by an Australian Fords publication.

== XB series ==
Launched in September 1973, the XB GT was to be the last Falcon GT for almost 20 years, until the 25th Anniversary EBII GT in October 1992. The XB GT received a new aggressive front end with a twin nostril bonnet, similar to the style found on the '71-'73 Mach 1 Mustang. The XB was the most popular GT model built by Ford with a total of 2,899 (1,950 sedans and 949 hardtops) sold. In August 1975, Ford introduced the John Goss Special, a limited-edition hardtop with a unique colour scheme and several GT appearance and interior features, to celebrate the fact that Goss was the only driver to win both the Australian Grand Prix and the Bathurst 1000.

== EB II and EL series ==
In 1991, Ford Australia entered in a joint venture with Tickford, establishing Tickford Vehicle Engineering (TVE) as its high-performance arm. Apart from developing Falcon's XR sports models and fitting certain accessories to the Falcon and Fairlane range (e.g. LPG systems and sunroofs), TVE took advantage of the return of a V8 powerplant since 1982 by releasing "25th Anniversary" and "30th Anniversary" editions of the Falcon GT, based on the EB II series.

The anniversary years are based from the time of the introduction of the first Falcon GT in 1967 (based on the XR series), and became the first time that a Falcon GT was again available since the last GT of 1973-1976 (based on the XB series). These GTs represented, for the first time, a shift from pure performance to a refined grand tourer vehicle, as highlighted by their interiors based on the luxury-oriented Fairmont Ghia models.

== BA to FG series ==
After FTE's relative lack of success with its AU series-based T-series models sold between 1999 and 2002, the GT nameplate was revived by Ford Performance Vehicles (FPV), a new joint venture between Prodrive and Ford Australia established in 2003. The FPV GT range was thus available with the BA (2002), BF (2006) and FG (2008) series. The FPV model range generally comprised the base GT (whose subsequent derivative GS justified the absence of a Falcon XR8), higher performance and specification GT-P. In 2008, it was expanded with the luxury-oriented variant GT-E, and between 2007 and 2014, the range was also bolstered by various limited editions. Those BF series models included the:

- GT "40th Anniversary" (March 2007; 200 sedans, 25 of which were exported to New Zealand) to commemorate the first Falcon GT of 1967; it featured: special interior and colour accents, distinctive 19-inch alloy wheels and "R-Spec" handling package
- GT "Cobra" (October 2007; 400 sedans and 100, non-GT, Super Pursuit utes) to commemorate the 30th anniversary of the original Ford Falcon Cobra; it featured: engine power upgrade from 290–302 kW (389–405 hp) and 540 N⋅m (398 lb⋅ft) of torque, and "R-Spec" handling package

Limited editions based on the FPV FG series included the:

- GT "5th Anniversary" (October 2008; 200 sedans) to commemorate FPV's fifth birthday; launched at the Sydney Motor Show it featured: Lightning Strike (silver) or Silhouette (black) exterior paint with unique striping package, special multi-spoke alloy wheels in Alpine Silver, six piston Brembo brakes and a luxury Nudo leather interior.
- GT "Black" (August 2011; 125 sedans) unveiled at the Sydney Motor Show it was available only Silhouette and was completely painted in that colour (including alloy wheels, exhaust tips and exterior trims) with new matte black stripes, and was powered by a Boss 335 5.0-litre V8 supercharged engine with a maximum power output of 335 kW (449 hp)
- GT "R-Spec" (August 2012; 350 sedans and 75 utes) unveiled at the Sydney Motor Show, it was primarily available in Silhouette and striking red highlights and a "C" stripe down each side, echoing the 2012 Mustang "302 Boss" Laguna Seca, and featured the above V8 supercharged engine, "R-Spec" handling package plus wider (9-inch) rear wheels and launch control and could be optioned with an upgraded Brembo braking system
- GT-F "351" (June 2014; 550 sedans and 120 utes) as the "F"inal GT with its "351" badge representing its engine output but also paying tribute to the 351 cubic inch displacement of the engines used in the XW to XB models of the Falcon GT. It inherited the GT R-Spec"'s chassis enhancements and featured black highlights throughout including new matte black stripes.

== Model specifications ==
=== Ford ===
These vehicles were built between 1967 and 1976. GT models of either the XC (in lieu, Ford produced the Ford Falcon Cobra range in 1978) or EA were never produced.

Based on Falcon model	Years	Engine	Notes
XR	1967-68	289 cu in (4,736 cc) Windsor V8 – 225 bhp (168 kW; 228 PS), sourced from the Ford Mustang	593 units built all manual and in "GT Gold" paint. A further 8 were painted in "Gallaher Silver" and 5 others were painted in "Russet Bronze, Sultan Maroon, Polar White, Avis White and Ivy Green". The non-gold GTs, while having the same specifications, are the rarest of the early Australian sport sedans.
XT	1968–69	302 cu in (4,949 cc) V8 – 239 bhp (178 kW; 242 PS)
XW	1969–70	351 cu in (5,752 cc) Cleveland and Windsor V8 – 290 bhp (216 kW; 294 PS) and 385 lb⋅ft (522 N⋅m) The XW GT HO – 300 bhp (224 kW; 304 PS)	2,287 XW Falcon GTs and 662 XW GTHOs were built. The limited production, high-performance Falcon GTHO was released two months after the mainstream models. A further development, the GTHO Phase II was released in August 1970.
XY (see XY GT)	1970–72	351 cu in (5,752 cc) Cleveland V8 300 bhp (224 kW; 304 PS) with the XY GT HO Phase III producing 380 bhp (283 kW; 385 PS)	Variant: Ford Falcon GTHO Phase III
XA	1972–73	351 cu in (5,752 cc) Cleveland V8, 300 bhp (224 kW; 304 PS) at 5,400 rpm and 515 N⋅m (380 lb⋅ft) of torque at 3,400 rpm	Both 2-door Hardtop and 4-door Sedan versions Production of GTHO Phase IV commenced in mid-June 1972, four vehicles were built when production was stopped due to a "Supercar scare". Three were built as race cars for the Bathurst 500 in October, and one made it off the production line for sale to the public.
XB	1973–76	351 cu in (5,752 cc) Cleveland V8, 300 bhp (224 kW; 304 PS) at 5,400 rpm and 515 N⋅m (380 lb⋅ft) of torque at 3,400 rpm	Both 2-door Hardtop and 4-door Sedan versions

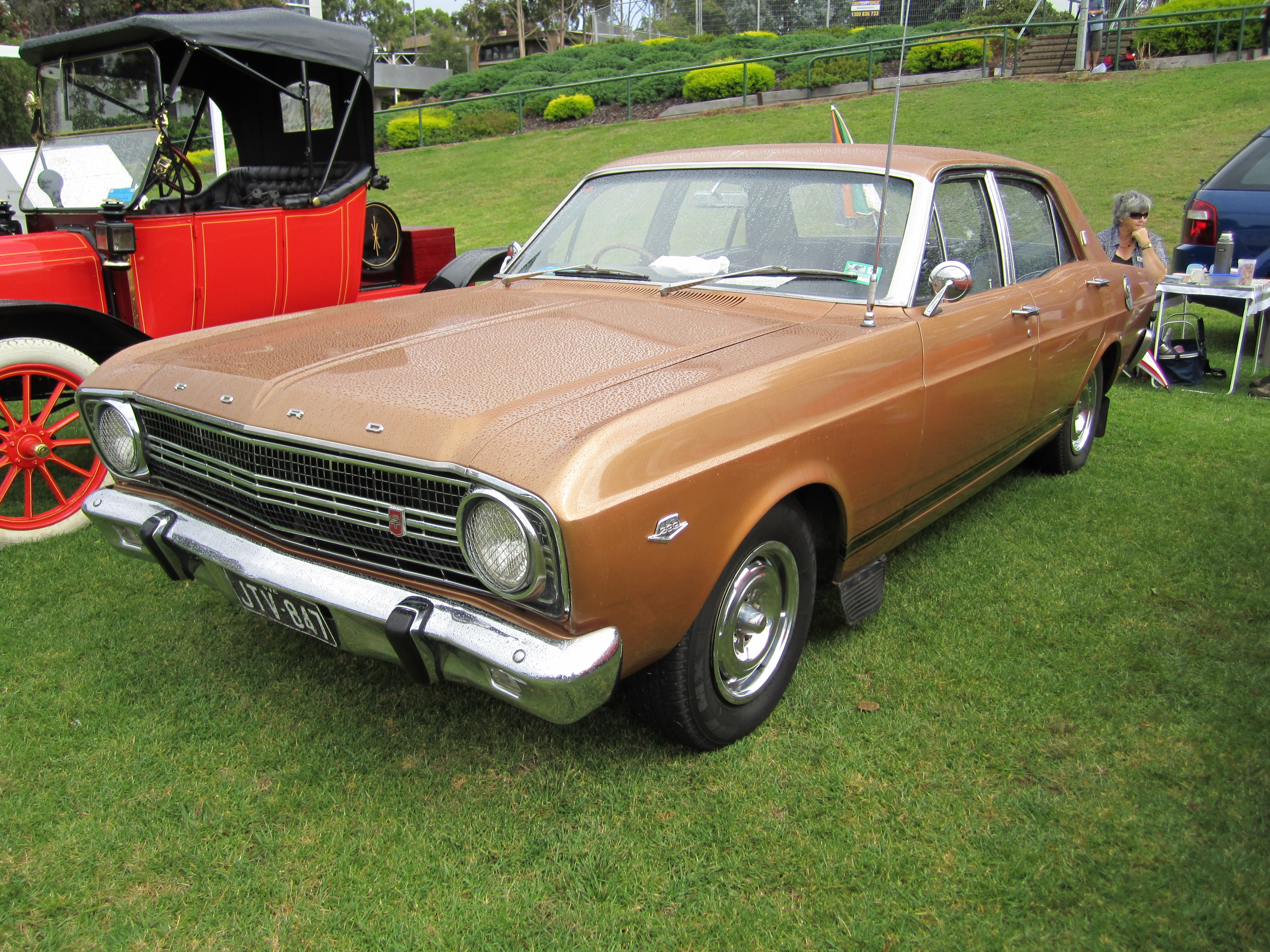
Ford XR Falcon GT

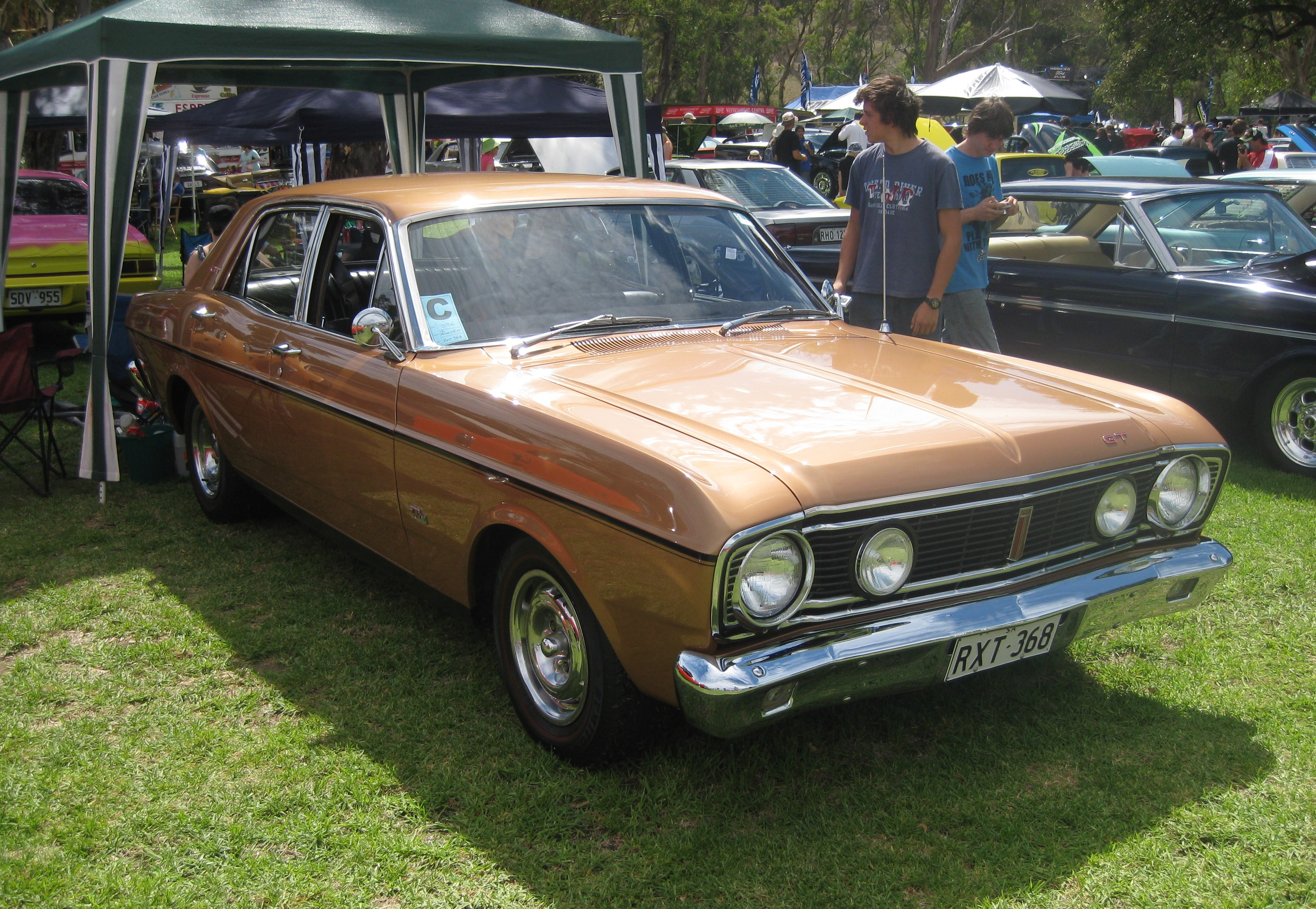
Ford XT Falcon GT

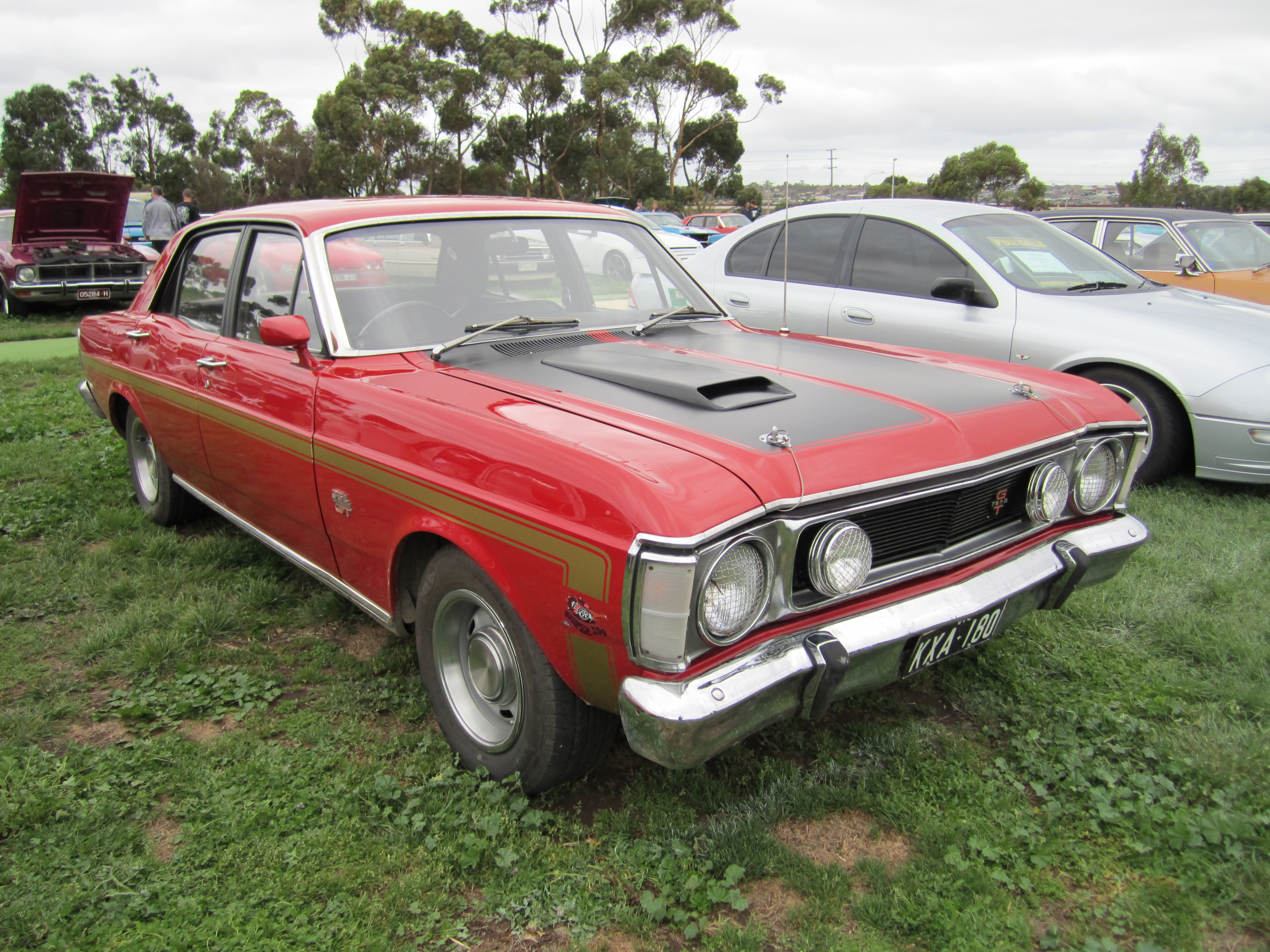
Ford XW Falcon GT

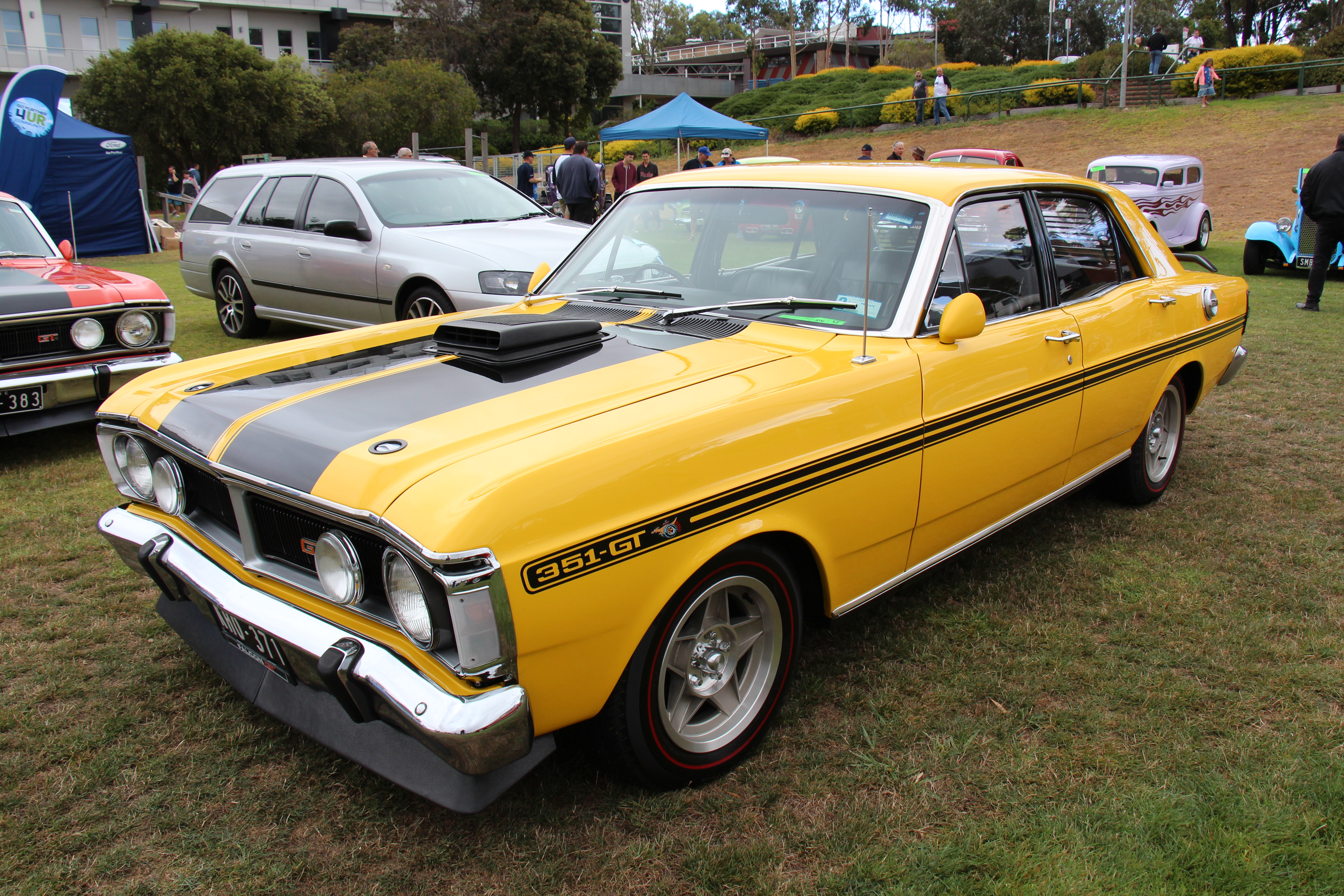
Ford XY Falcon GTHO

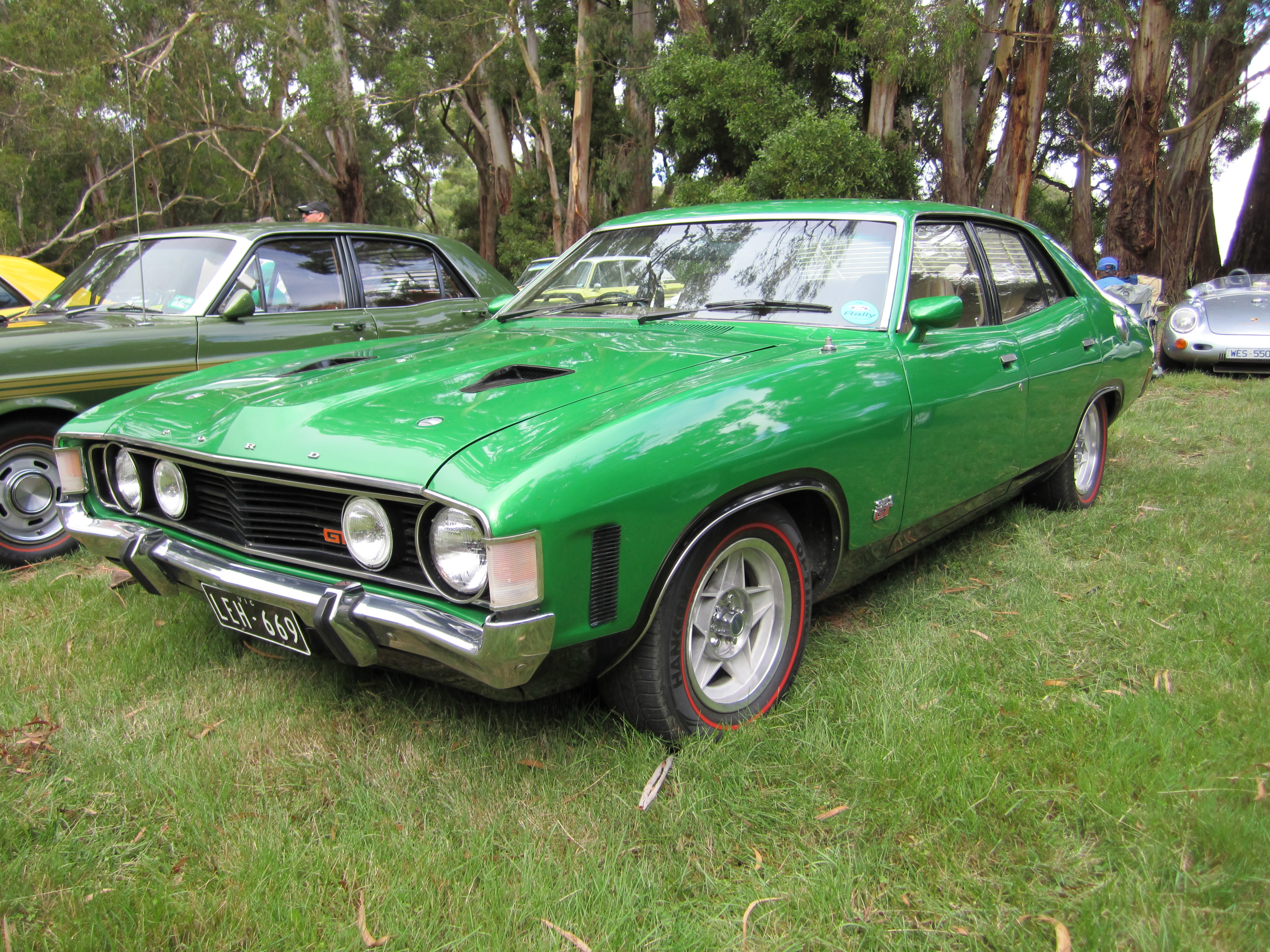
Ford XA Falcon GT sedan

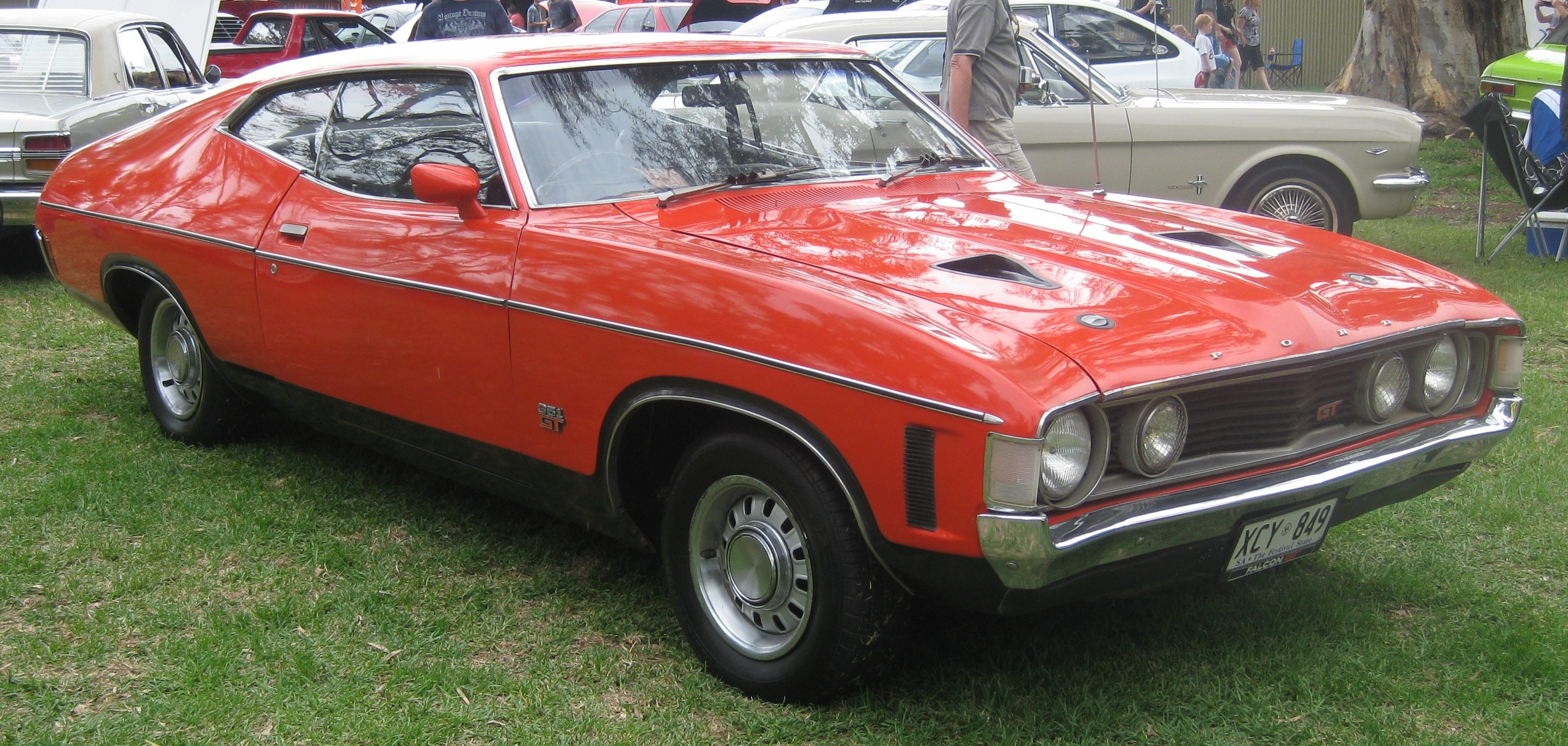
Ford XA Falcon GT hardtop

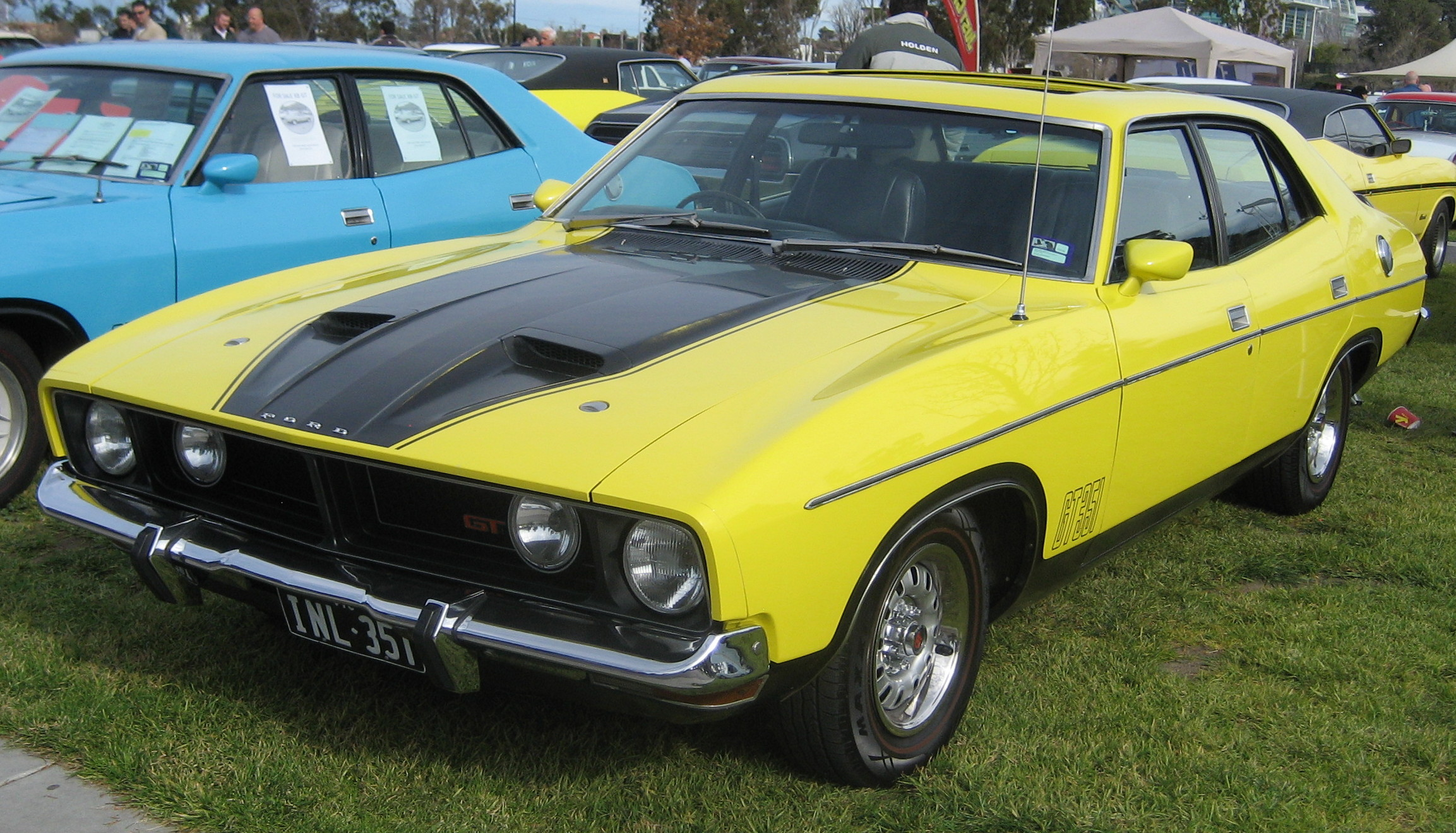
Ford XB Falcon GT sedan

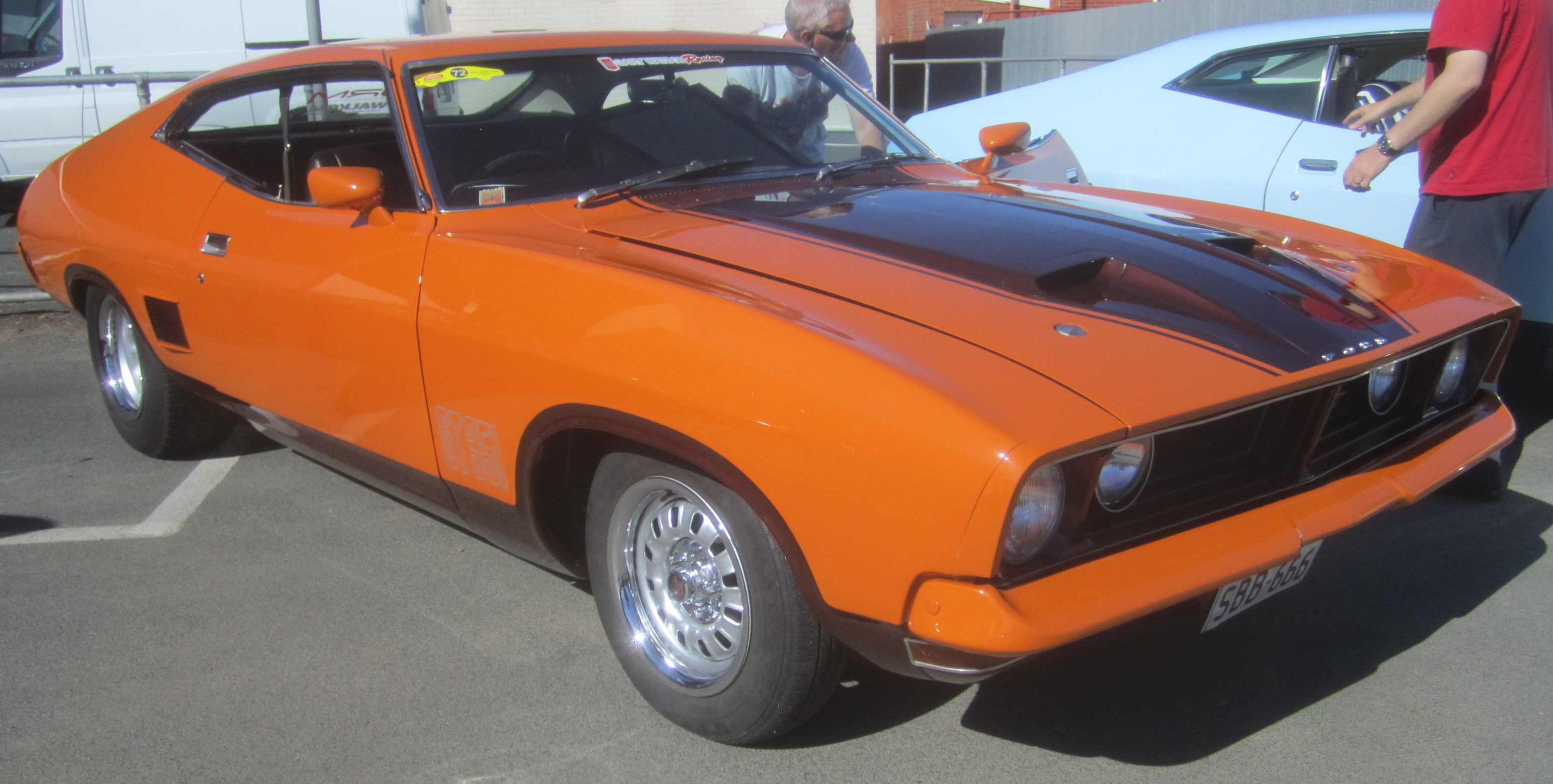
Ford XB Falcon GT hardtop

=== Tickford ===
These vehicles ended a 16-year absence of the GT nameplate from the Falcon range.

Based on Falcon model	Years	Engine	Notes
EB II	1992	Tickford engineered Windsor 302 cu in (4,950 cc) 5.0 V8, sequentially injected OHV, two valves per cylinder 200 kW (268 hp; 272 PS) at 5,700 rpm and 420 N⋅m (310 lb⋅ft) of torque at 3,700 rpm Transmission: 5-speed manual or 4-speed auto	Celebrating the 25th anniversary of the first original Falcon GT, with a total production of 265 units taking a more refined grand tourer approach. The interior was in fact based on that of the Fairmont Ghia.
EL	1997	Tickford engineered Windsor 302 cu in (4,950 cc) 5.0 V8	The 30th anniversary EL GT continued the refined grand tourer role of its EB II predecessor, with 272 units built.

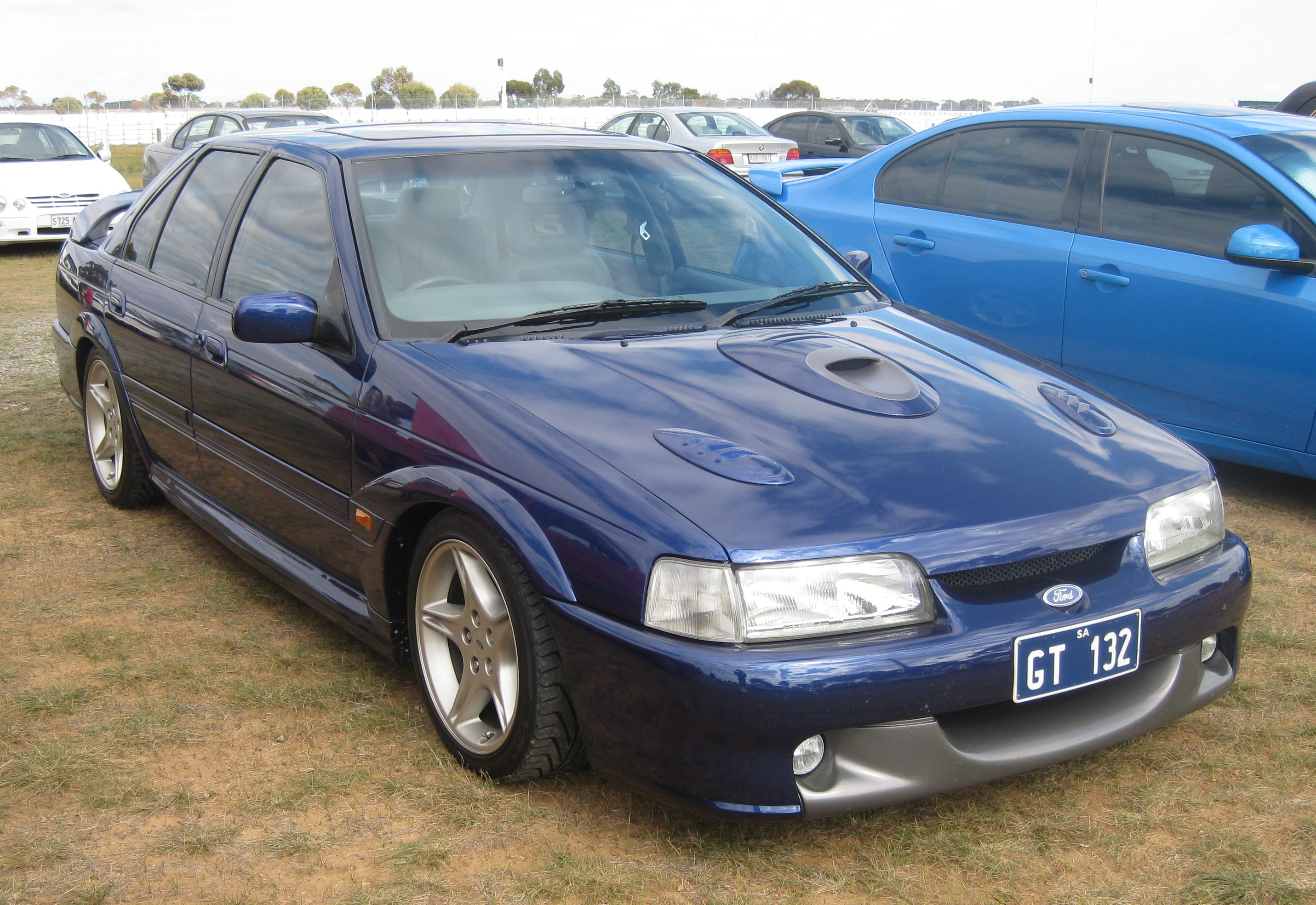
Ford EB II Falcon GT

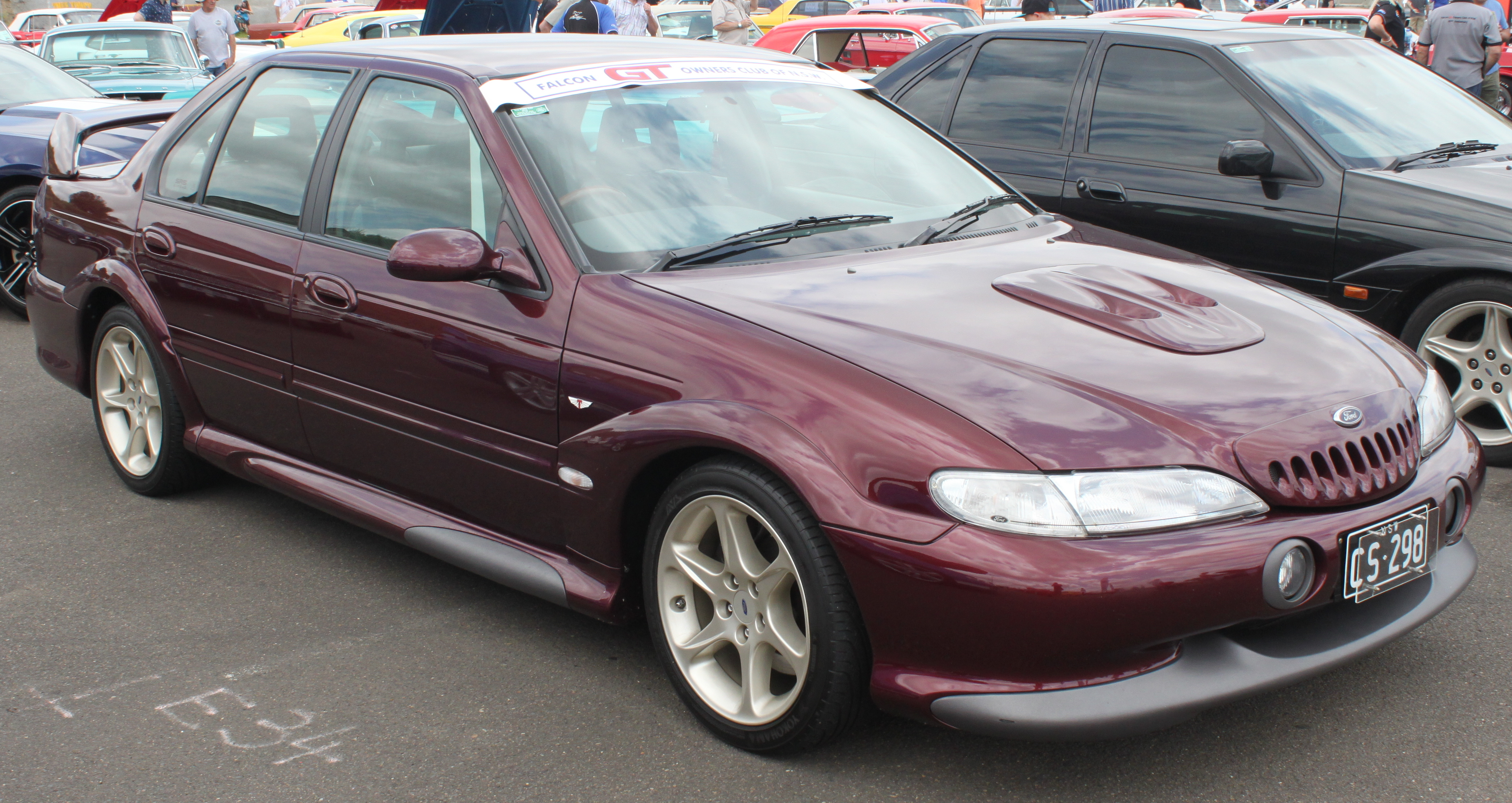
Ford EL Falcon GT

=== FPV ===
From 2003 to 2014, the GT model name was used for the Ford Falcon-based FPV GT, built and marketed by Ford Performance Vehicles.

Based on Falcon model	Years	Engine	Notes
BA	2003–2005	5,400 cc (330 cu in) Boss 290 V8 producing 290 kW (389 hp; 394 PS) at 5,500 rpm and 520 N⋅m (384 lb⋅ft) of torque at 4,500 rpm	GT and GT-P variants (in BA MkII guise from 2014)
BF	2005–2007	5,400 cc (330 cu in) Boss 290 V8 4-valve DOHC, 290 kW; 394 PS (389 hp) and 521 N⋅m (384 lb⋅ft) of torque GT Cobra motor produced 302 kW; 411 PS (405 hp) and 540 N⋅m (398 lb⋅ft) of torque	GT and GT-P (in BF MkII guise from 2006) Limited editions included the: 2007 GT "40th Anniversary" (200 units, 25 of which were exported to New Zealand; 111 units manual, 14 of which with upgraded Brembo brakes; 89 automatic, 9 of which with upgraded Brembo brakes; units no.s 1 and 40 not sold to public due to number status), 2008 GT "Cobra R-Spec" (400 units).
FG	2008-2014	5,400 cc (330 cu in) Boss 315 V8 producing 315 kW (428 PS; 422 hp) at 6,500 rpm and 551 N⋅m (406 lb⋅ft) of torque at 4,750 rpm. From October 2010; 302 cu in (4,950 cc) 5.0 V8 supercharged alloy quad cam engine producing 335 kW (449 hp; 455 PS) at 5750–6000 rpm and 570 N⋅m (420 lb⋅ft) of torque between 2200 & 5500 rpm.	GT, GT-P, GT-E Limited editions included the: and 2008 GT "5th Anniversary" (200 units), 2011 GT "Black" (125 units), 2012 GT "R-spec" (350 units, 175 of which in Silhouette black) and the final 2014 GT-F "351" (550 units of which 50 exported).

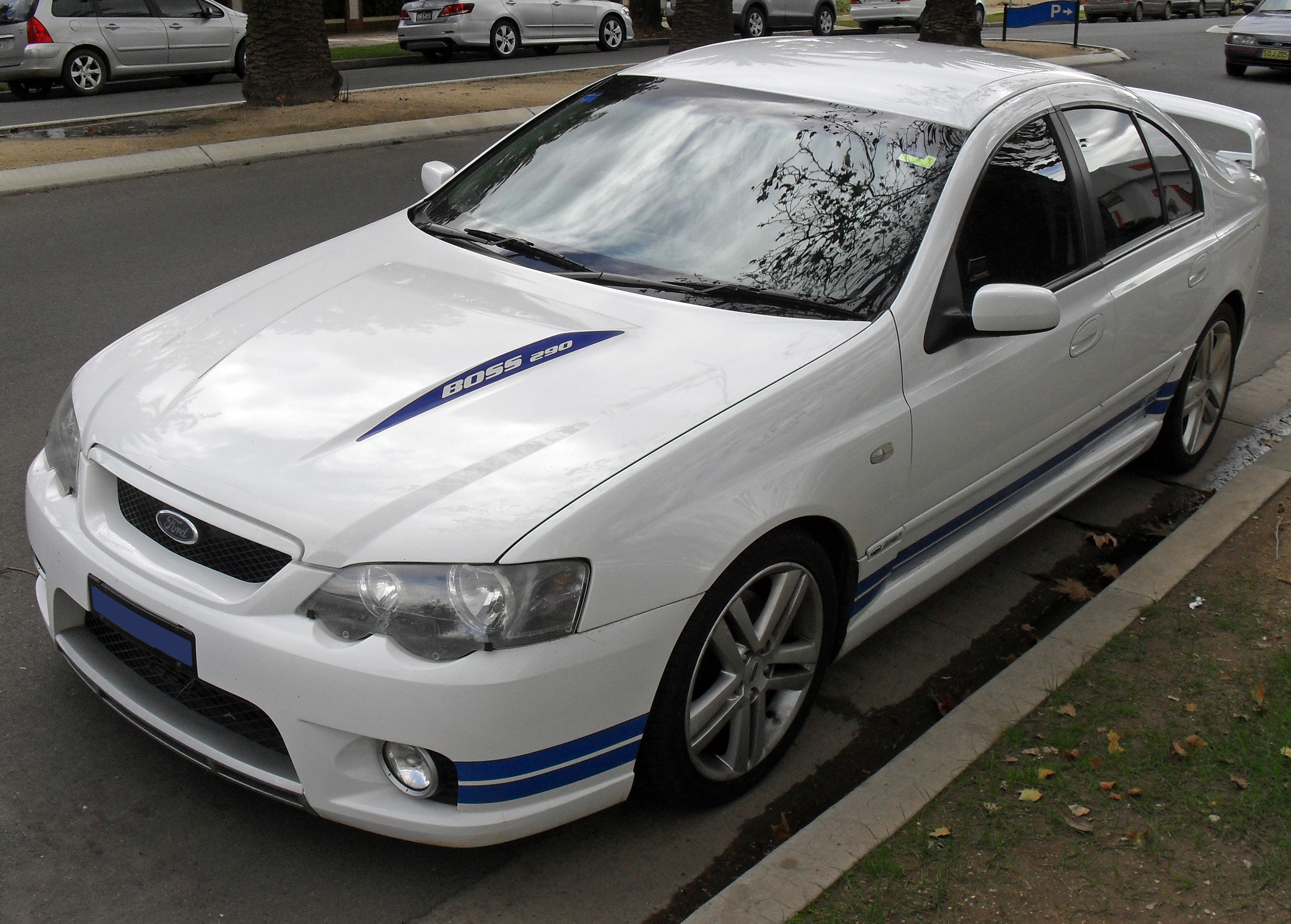
FPV BA GT

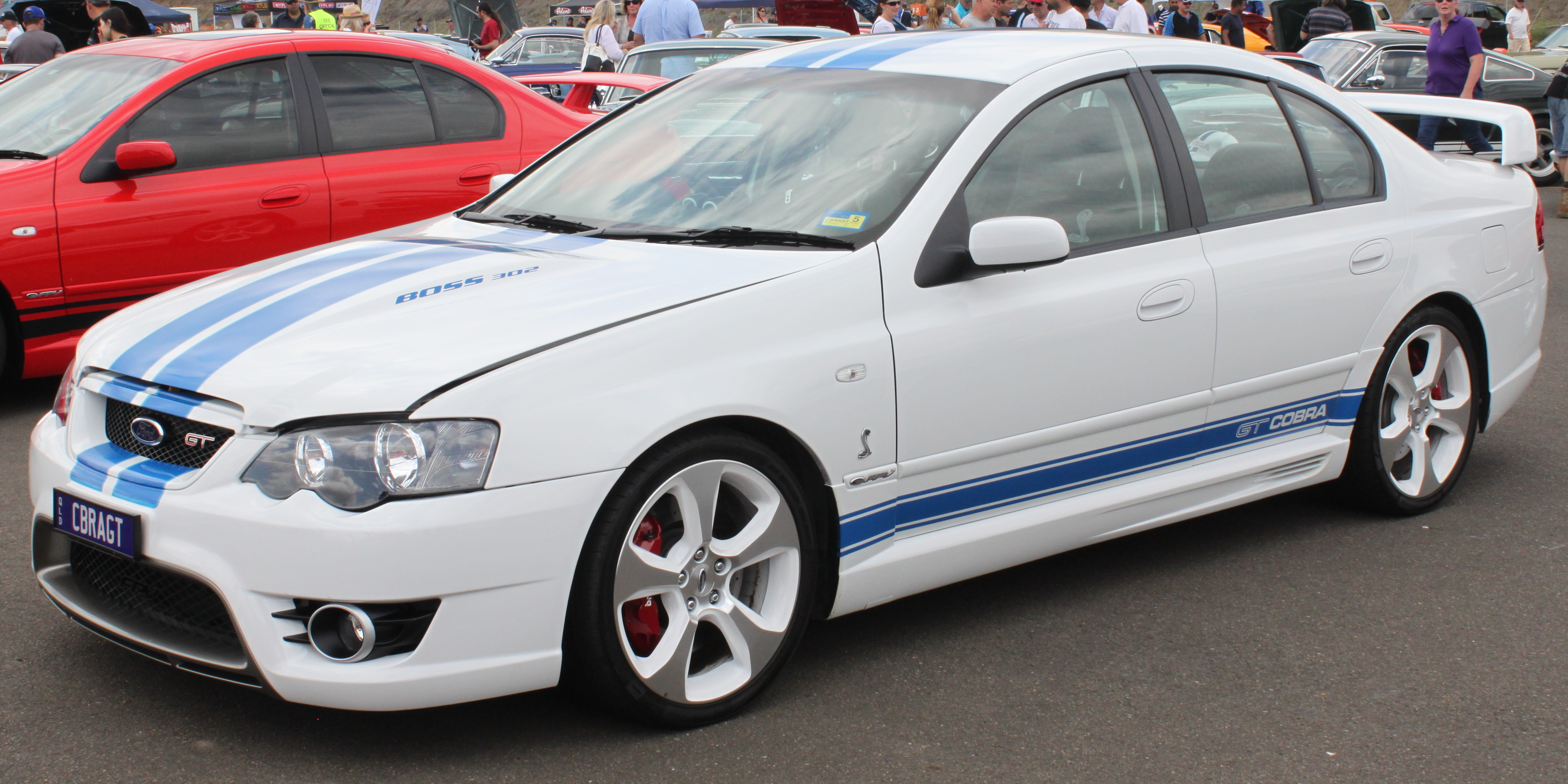
FPV BF GT Cobra

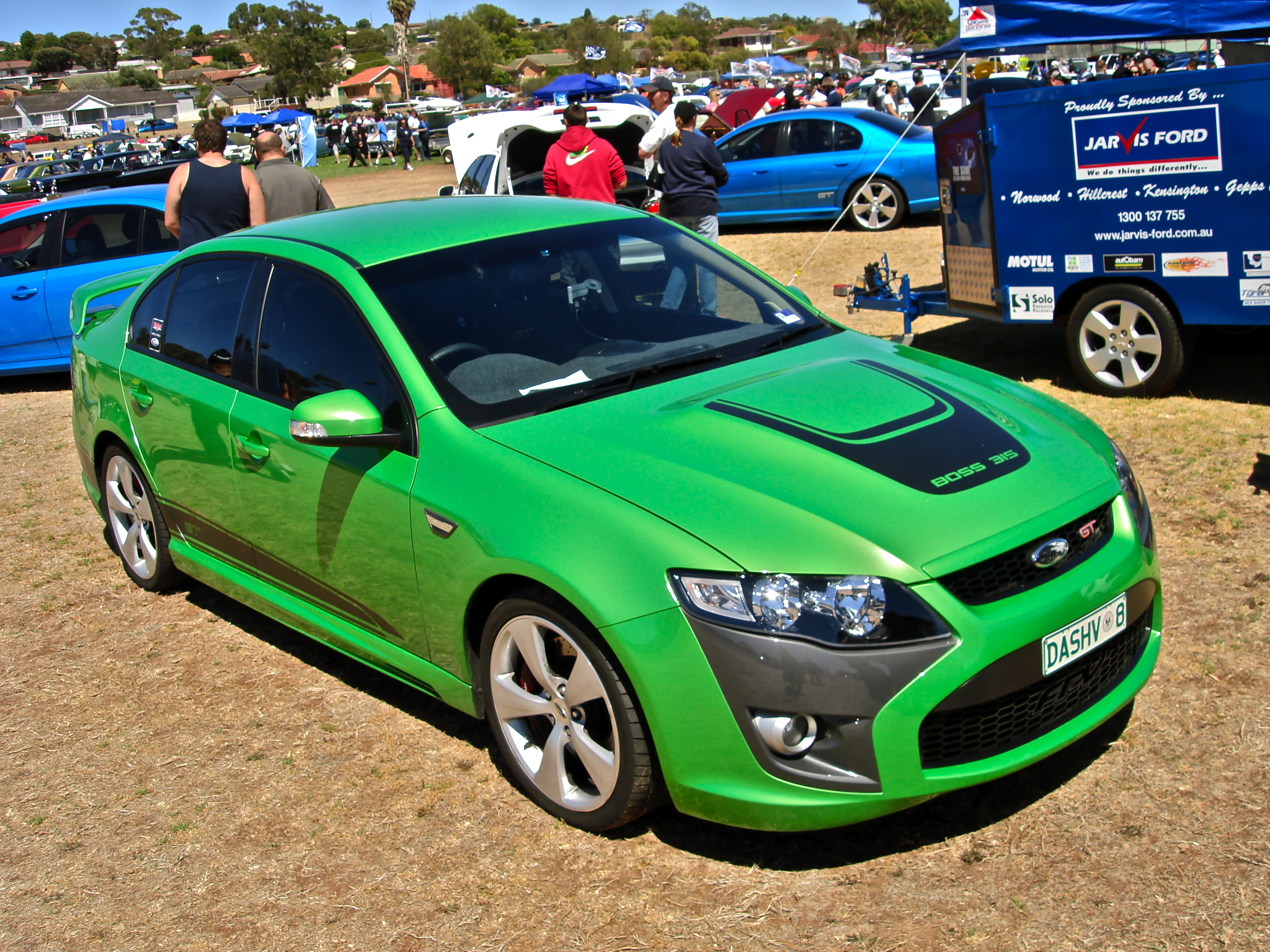
FPV FG GT

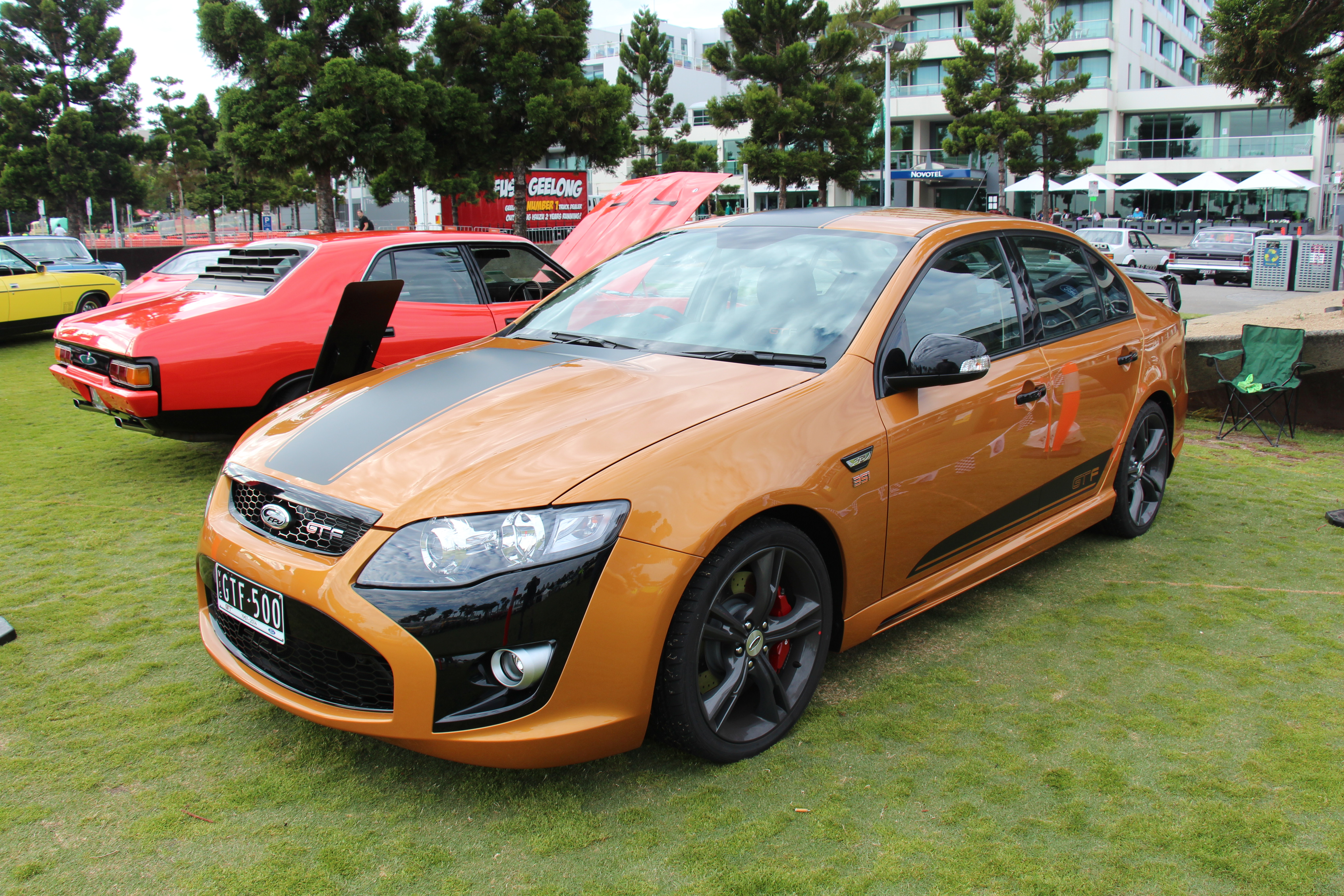
FPV FG GT-F
(the last FPV GT)

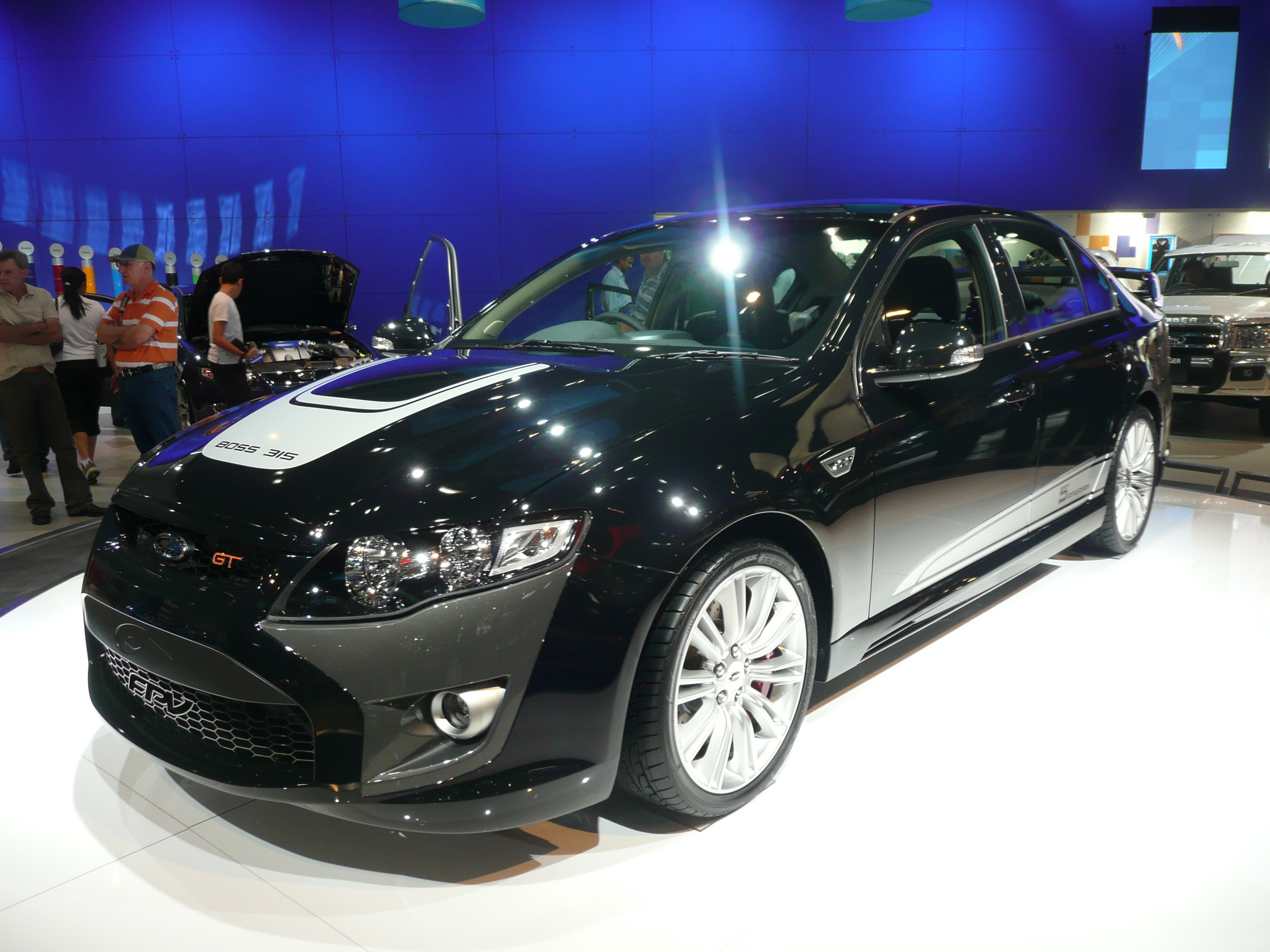
2008 FG FPV 5th Anniversary

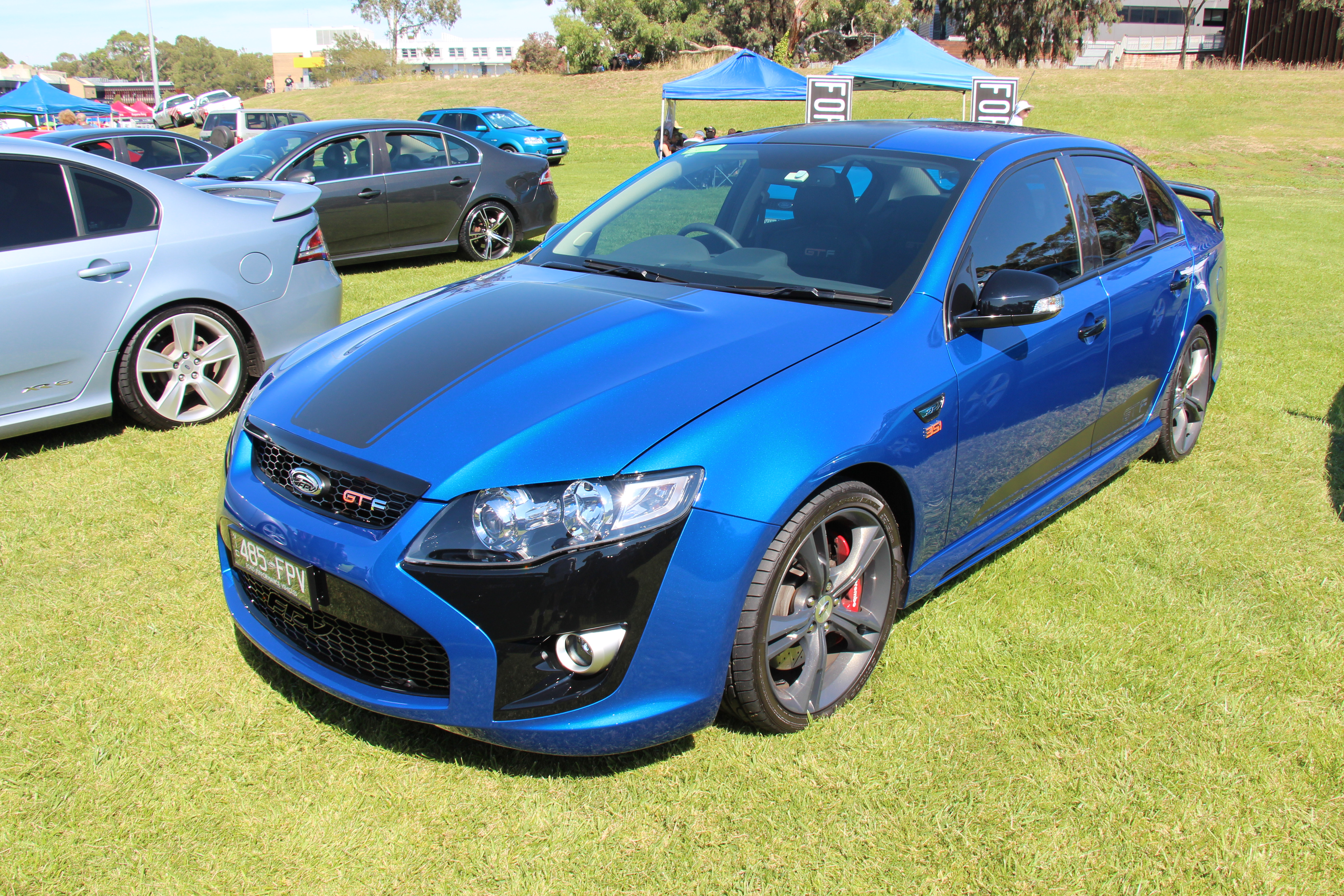
2014 FPV FG GT-F "Boss 351"

== Motorsport ==
The Falcon GT saw considerable success in the Australian Touring Car Championship, Australian Manufacturers' Championship and the Bathurst 500/Bathurst 1000. The Ford Works Team competed with Falcon GTs from 1967 to 1973.

== See also ==
- Pursuit Special
