= Ford Falcon (XA) =

Australian full-size car

Ford XA Falcon
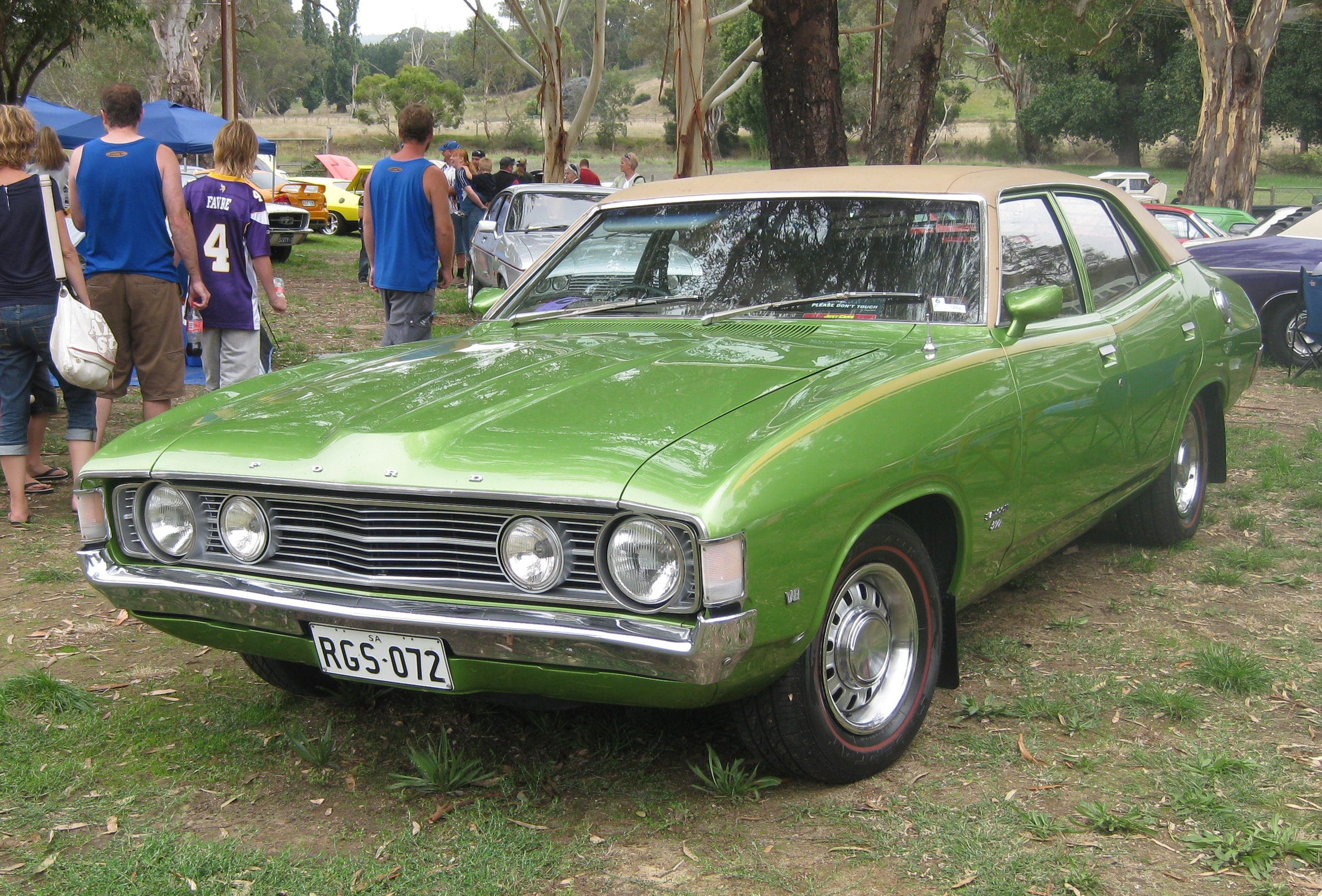
- Ford XA Falcon 500 Sedan with Grand Sport Rally Pack

Overview
- Manufacturer: Ford Australia
- Also called: Ford XA Futura; Ford XA Fairmont; Ford Ranchero (South Africa)
- Production: March 1972–September 1973
- Designer: Jack Telnack, Brian Rossi, Allan Jackson

Body and chassis
- Class: Full-size car
- Body style: 4-door sedan 5-door station wagon 2-door hardtop 2-door coupe utility 2-door van
- Layout: FR layout
- Related: Ford ZF Fairlane; Ford Cortina

Powertrain
- Engine: 3.3L (200ci) 6-cyl (130 bhp); 4.1L (250ci) 6-cyl (155 bhp); 4.1L (250ci) 6-cyl (170 bhp); 4.9L (302ci) V8 (240 bhp); 5.8L (351ci) V8 (260 bhp); 5.8L (351ci) V8 (300 bhp) (GT only)
- Transmission: 3-speed manual 4-speed manual 3-speed automatic

Dimensions
- Wheelbase: 2,819 mm (111.0 in)
- Length: 4,737 mm (186.5 in)
- Width: 1,900 mm (74.8 in)
- Height: 1,369 mm (53.9 in)
- Kerb weight: 1,369 kg (3,018.1 lb)

Chronology
- Predecessor: Ford XY Falcon
- Successor: Ford XB Falcon

The Ford Falcon (XA) is a full-size car that was produced by Ford Australia from 1972 to 1973. It was the first iteration of the third generation of the Falcon and also included the Ford Fairmont (XA)—the luxury-oriented version. The XA platform was also used for the Australian Ford Landau.

== Overview ==
Sold between March 1972 and September 1973, the XA series was the first Falcon to be designed (with assistance from Ford's US headquarters) and manufactured in Australia. Designed by Jack Telnack, it featured an entirely new body which was larger and more roomy than that of its XY series predecessor, giving it the "coke-bottle" look. and offered a longer list of options.

Sedans and Wagons were introduced in March 1972, the Hardtops in August 1972. and the Utilities and Vans in October of that year. Wagons, utilities and panel vans now featured a longer wheelbase than the sedan. Fairmont wagons had a dual-action tailgate that could be opened either downwards or sideways, optional on base model Falcon and Falcon 500 Wagons.

The addition of a two-door hardtop to the range marked the first time that this body style had been offered on an Australian Falcon since the XP series of 1965–1966. The XA hardtop bore a notable resemblance to the U.S 1971-1973 Ford Mustang hardtop.

The XA hardtop's longer doors with frameless windows were shared with the utility and van, with a different shape glass to suit the commercial vehicles' body apertures. The shorter doors of the sedan and wagon with their framed windows were also available with optional quarter vent windows, though these were very rare, mainly fitted to cars in the hotter parts of Australia. This option was available in the subsequent XB and XC models, though very scarce.

The XA Falcon range were the first Falcons fitted with in-dash vents for face level flow-thru ventilation, although they only worked while the car was in motion.

A total of 129,473 XAs were built. While successful, the XA Falcon range proved to be short-lived as it gained a significant frontal appearance update to become the XB series in September 1973.

Assembly of the XA and subsequent ranges in New Zealand was transferred from Ford NZ's Seaview plant to the brand new purpose built plant at Wiri in 1973 and would continue there for another twenty years.

== Powertrains and model range ==
The XA carried over the same six-cylinder engines previously offered on the XY Falcon range.

In response to the growing popularity of its V8 engine options and the expense of importing V8s from North America, Ford Australia began local manufacture of the Cleveland V8 at its Geelong plant. As well as building the 351 cu in (5,766 cc) variant, it developed a de-stroked 302 cu in (4,942 cc) variant of this engine to replace the imported Windsor 302 engine. The high-performance variant of the 351 with four-barrel carburettor continued to be imported, eventually being replaced with a locally-produced variant during the XB model run.

Engine options for the various models were as follows, with one or two-barrel carburettor options for the 250 cid inline six-cylinder and two or four-barrel options for the 351 cid eight-cylinder engines.

Model	body	200-1V I6	250-1V I6	250-2V I6	302-2V V8	351-2V V8	351-4V V8
Falcon	Sedan	●	●	●	●	●	−
Falcon	Wagon	●	●	●	●	−	−
Falcon	Utility	●	●	●	●	●	−
Falcon	Van	●	●	●	●	−	−
Falcon 500	Sedan	●	●	●	●	●	−
Falcon 500	Wagon	●	●	●	●	−	−
Falcon 500	Hardtop	●	●	●	●	●	−
Falcon 500	Utility	●	●	●	●	●	−
Futura	Sedan	−	●	●	●	●	−
Fairmont	Sedan	−	●	●	●	●	−
Fairmont	Wagon	−	●	●	●	−	−
Fairmont	Hardtop	−	●	●	●	●	−
Falcon GT	Sedan	−	−	−	−	−	●
Falcon GT	Hardtop	−	−	−	−	−	●
ZF Fairlane Custom	Sedan LWB	−	●	−	●	●	−
ZF Fairlane 500	Sedan LWB	−	−	−	●	●	−

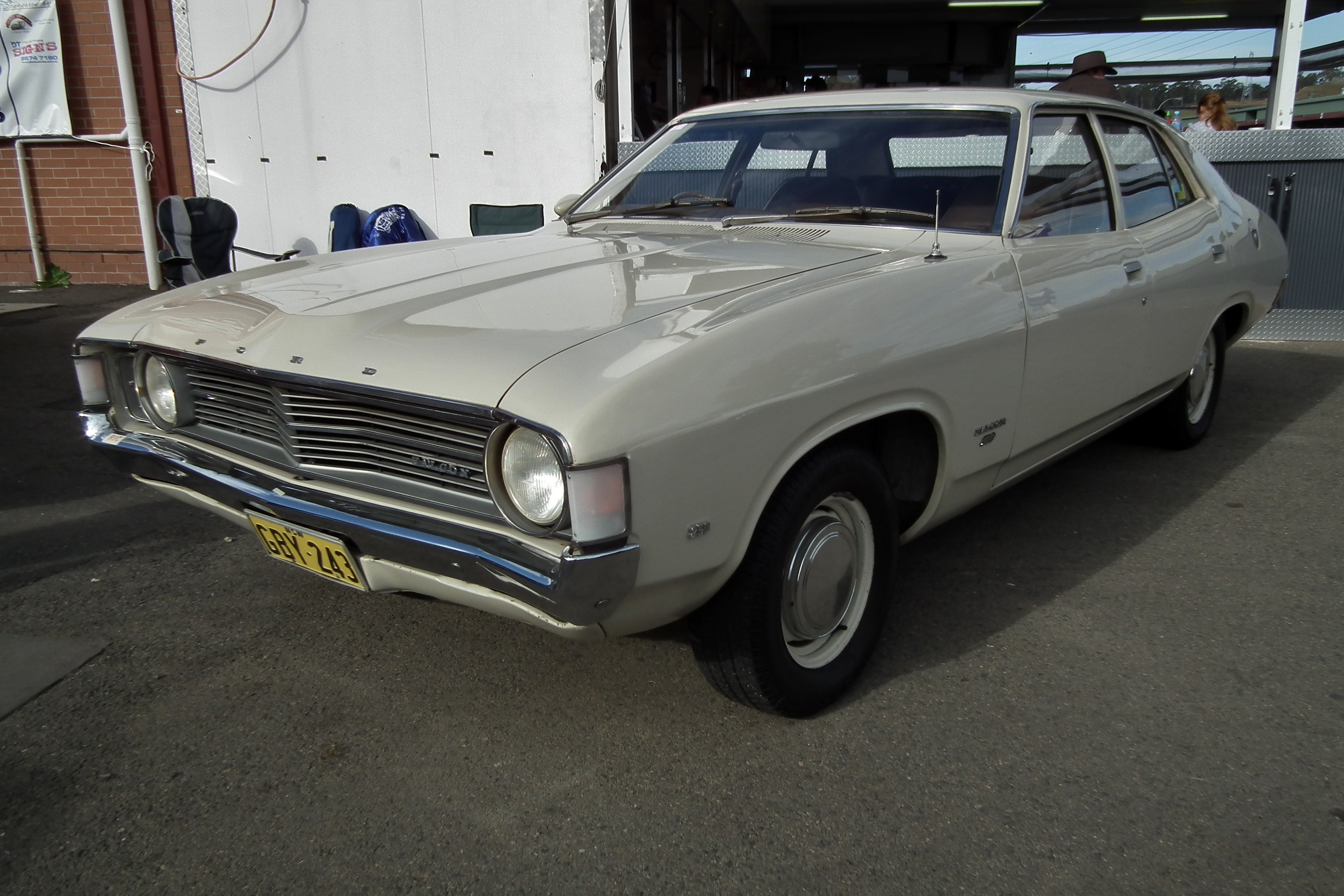
Ford XA Falcon 500 Sedan

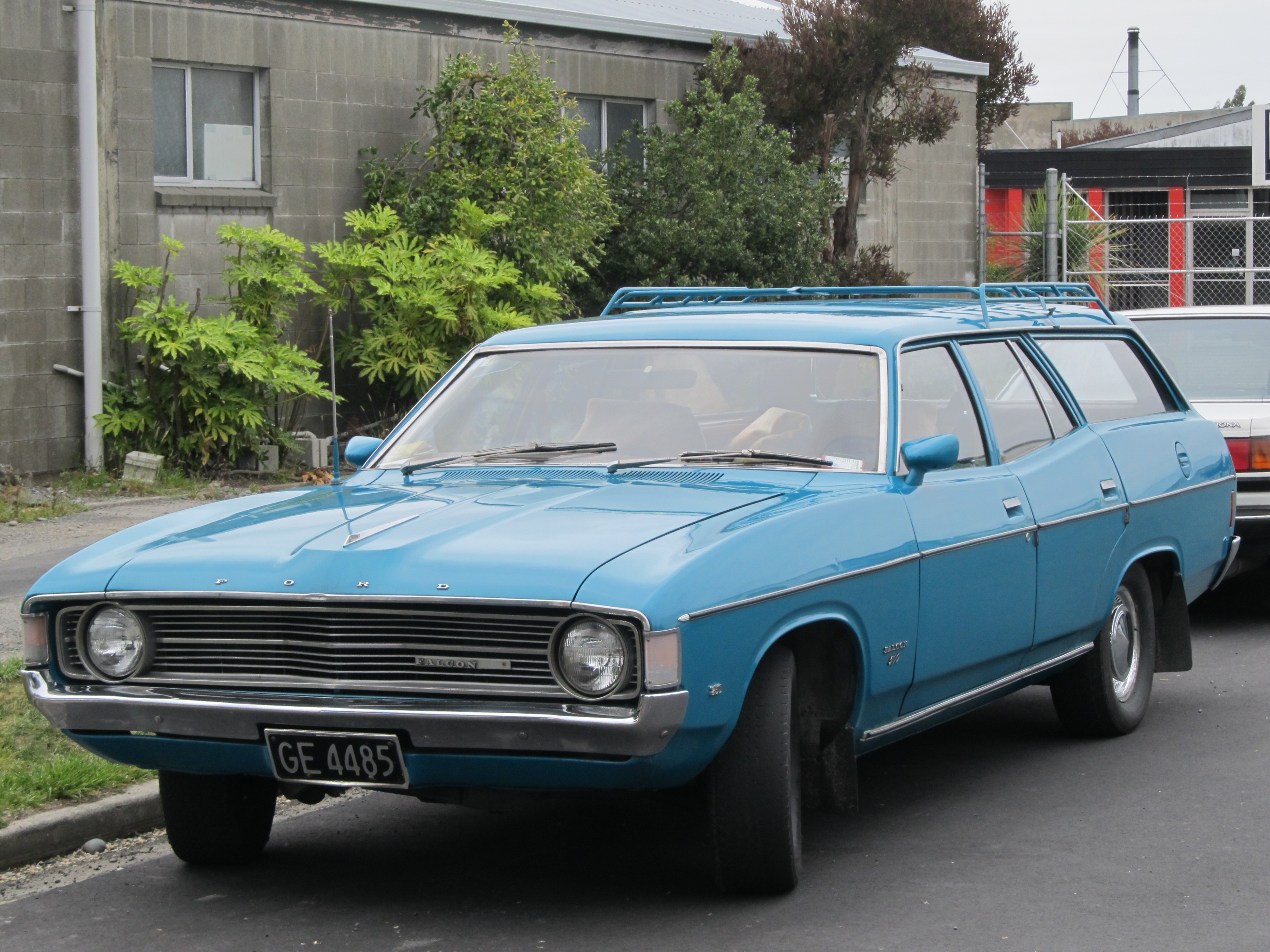
Ford XA Falcon 500 Wagon

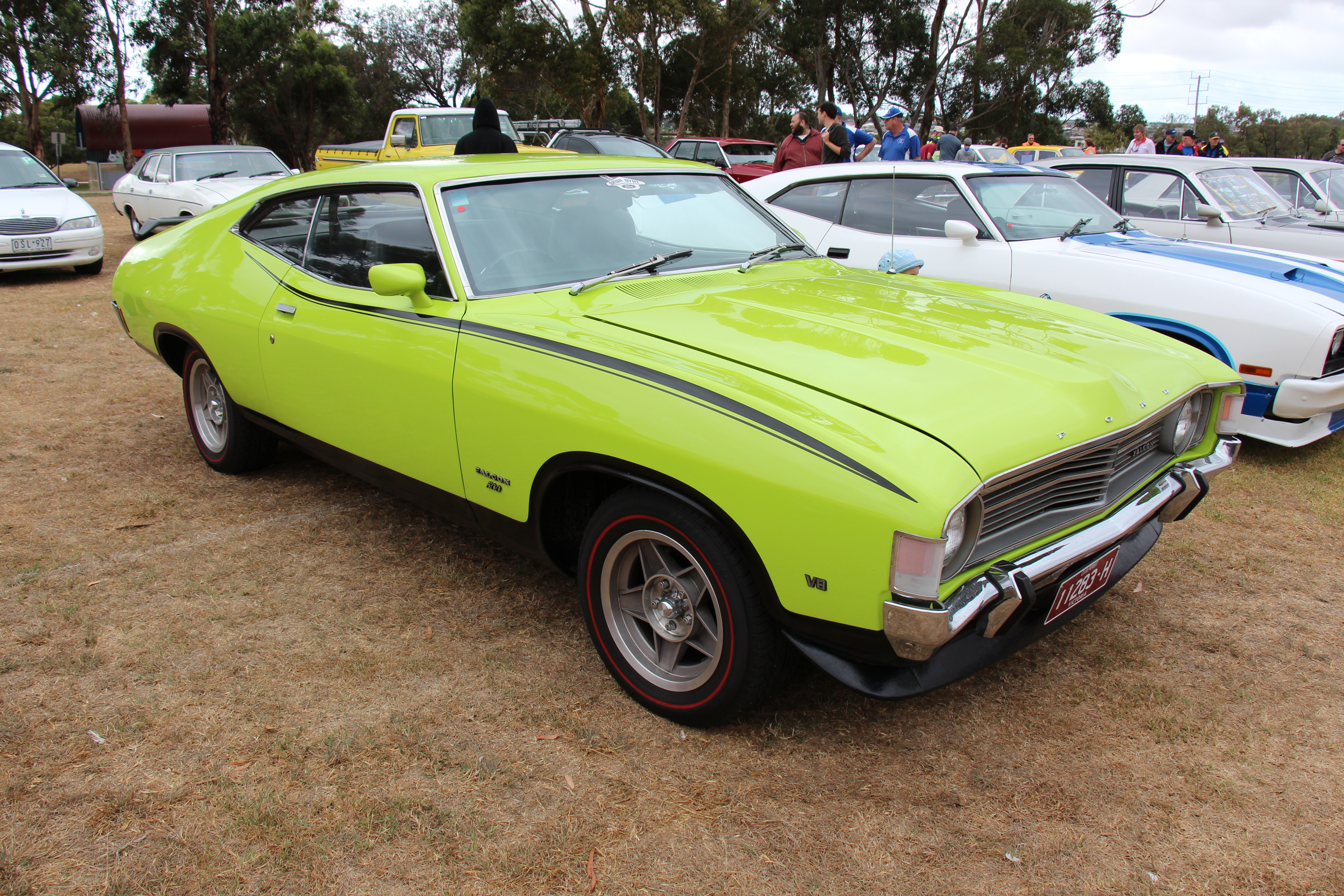
Ford XA Falcon 500 Hardtop (with non-standard wheels)

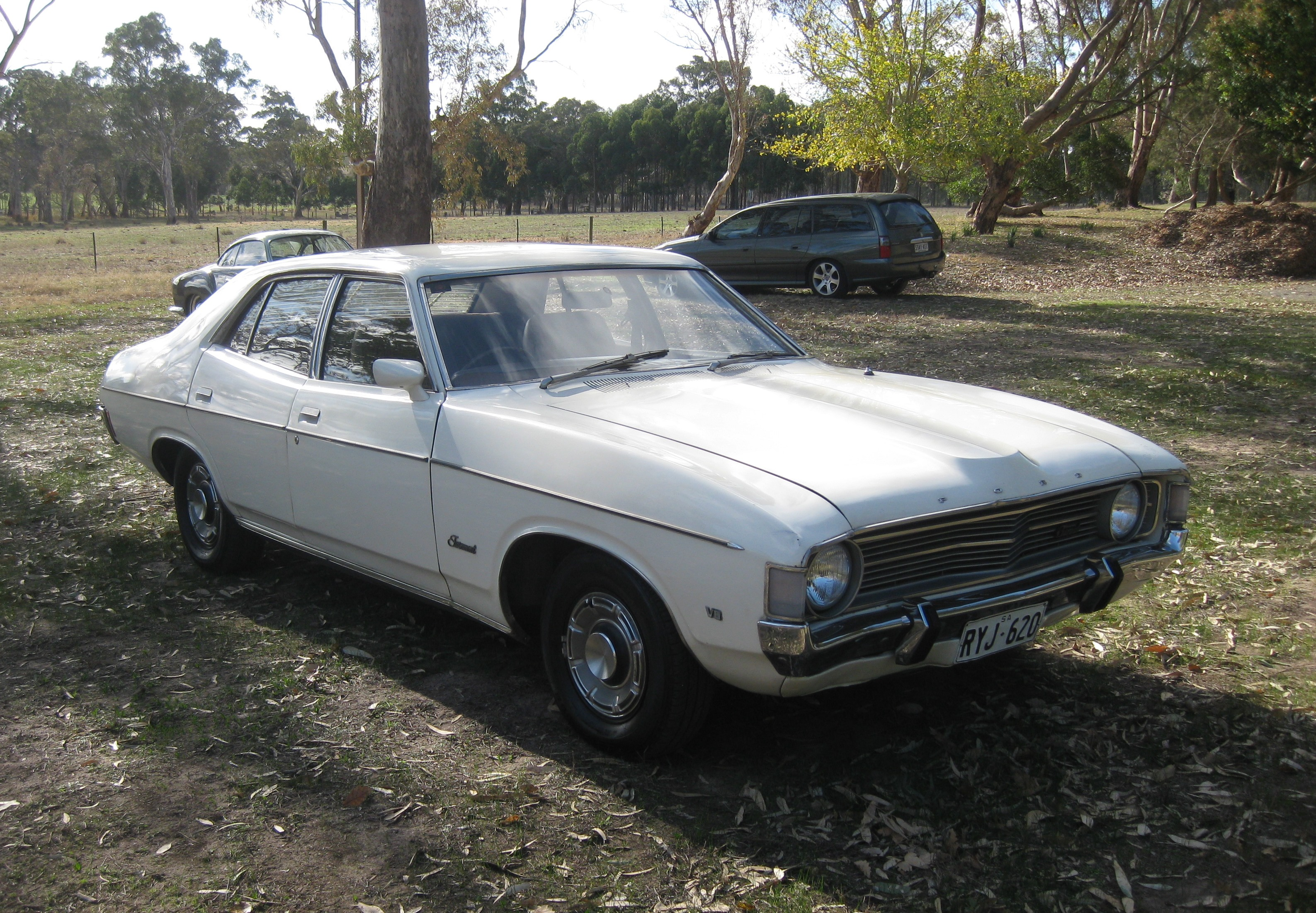
Ford XA Fairmont Sedan

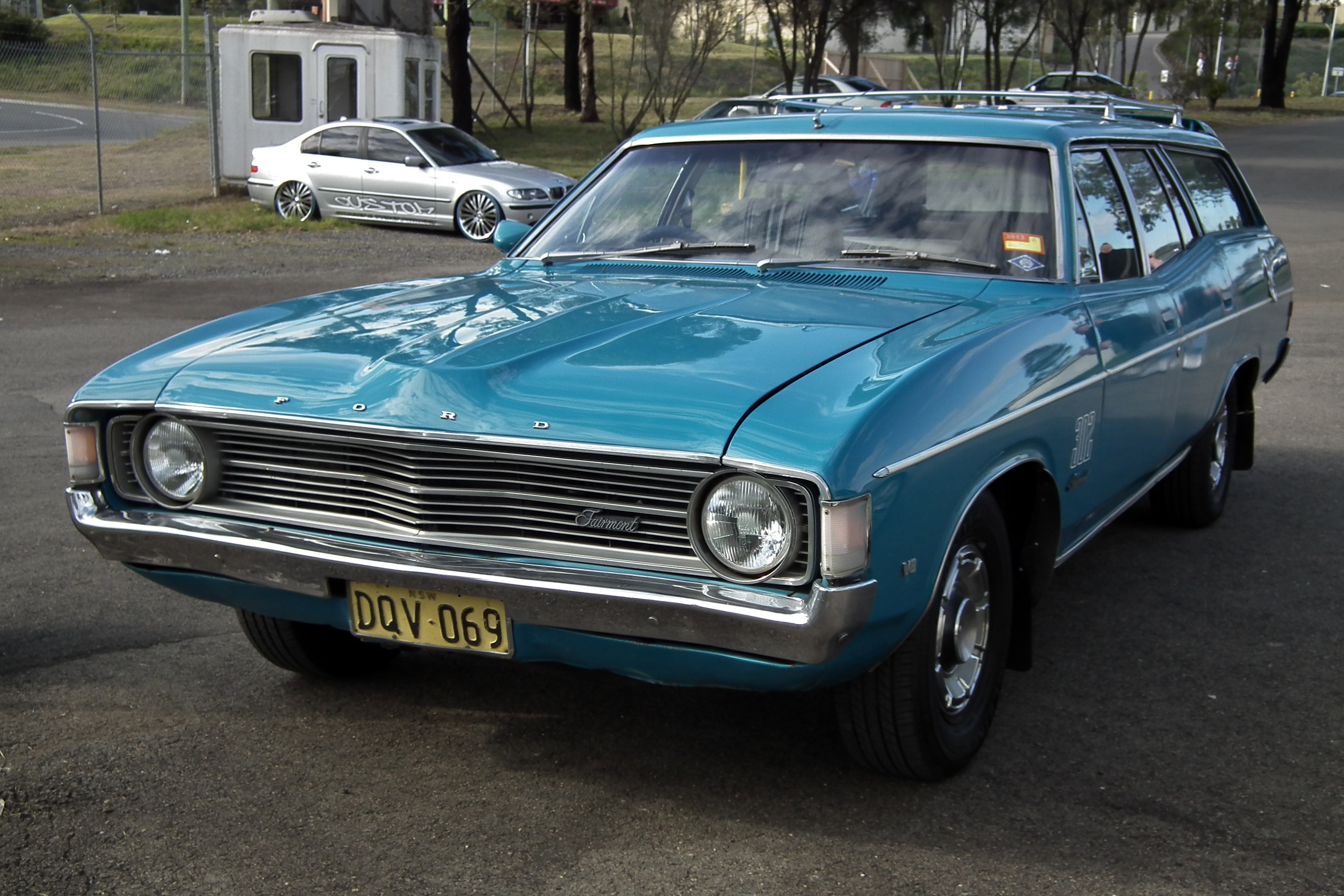
Ford XA Fairmont Wagon

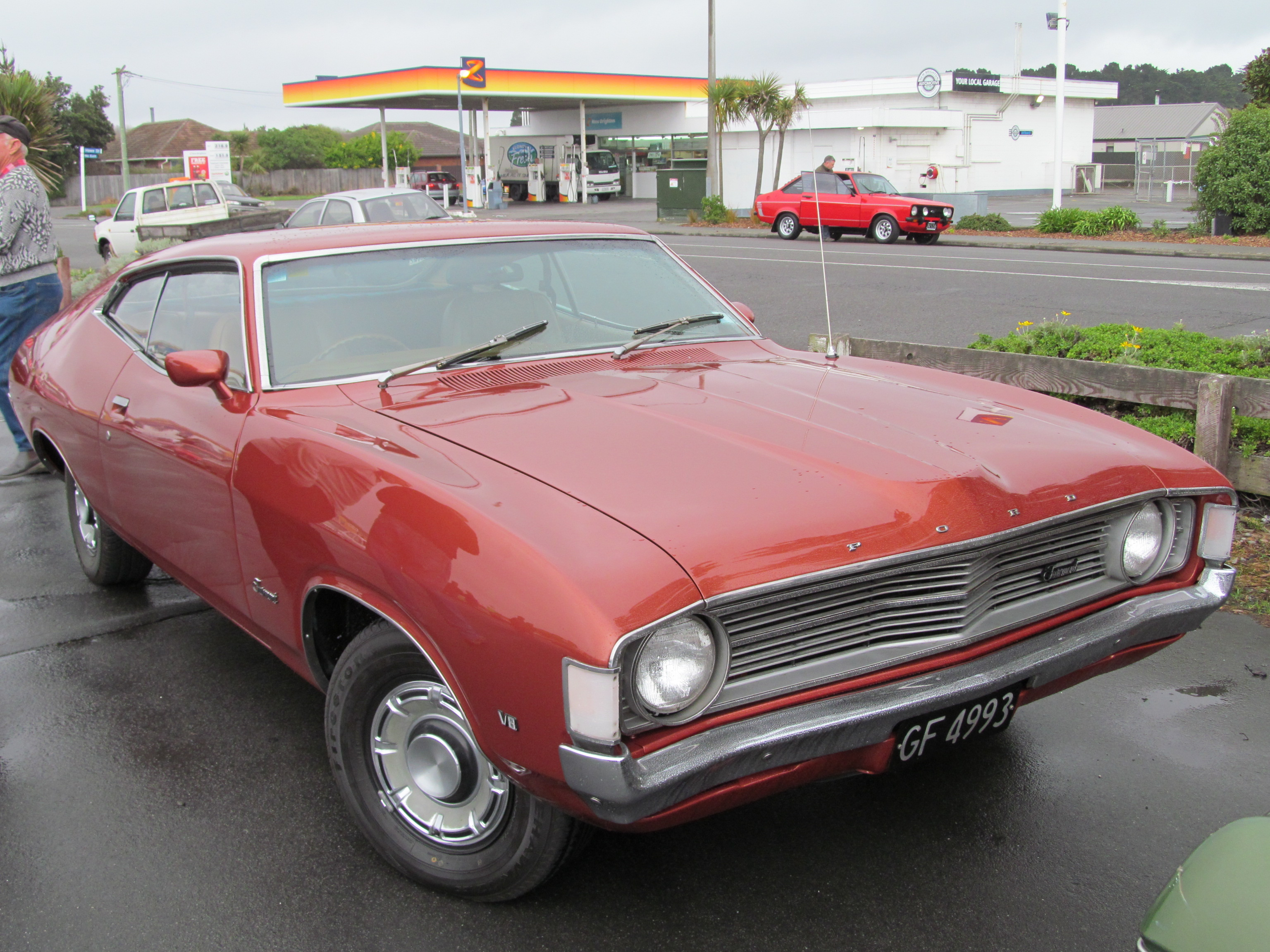
Ford XA Fairmont Hardtop

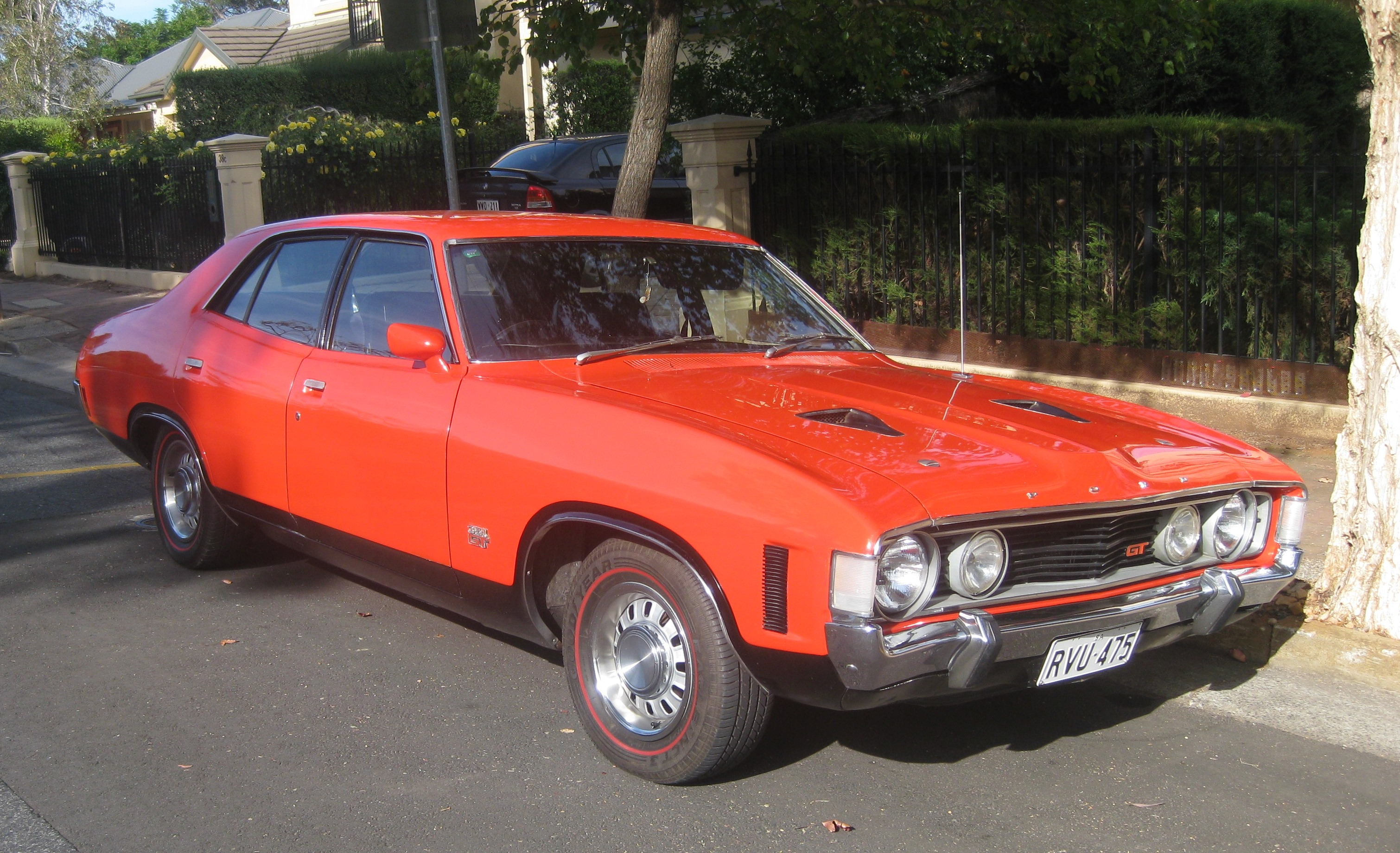
Ford XA Falcon GT Sedan

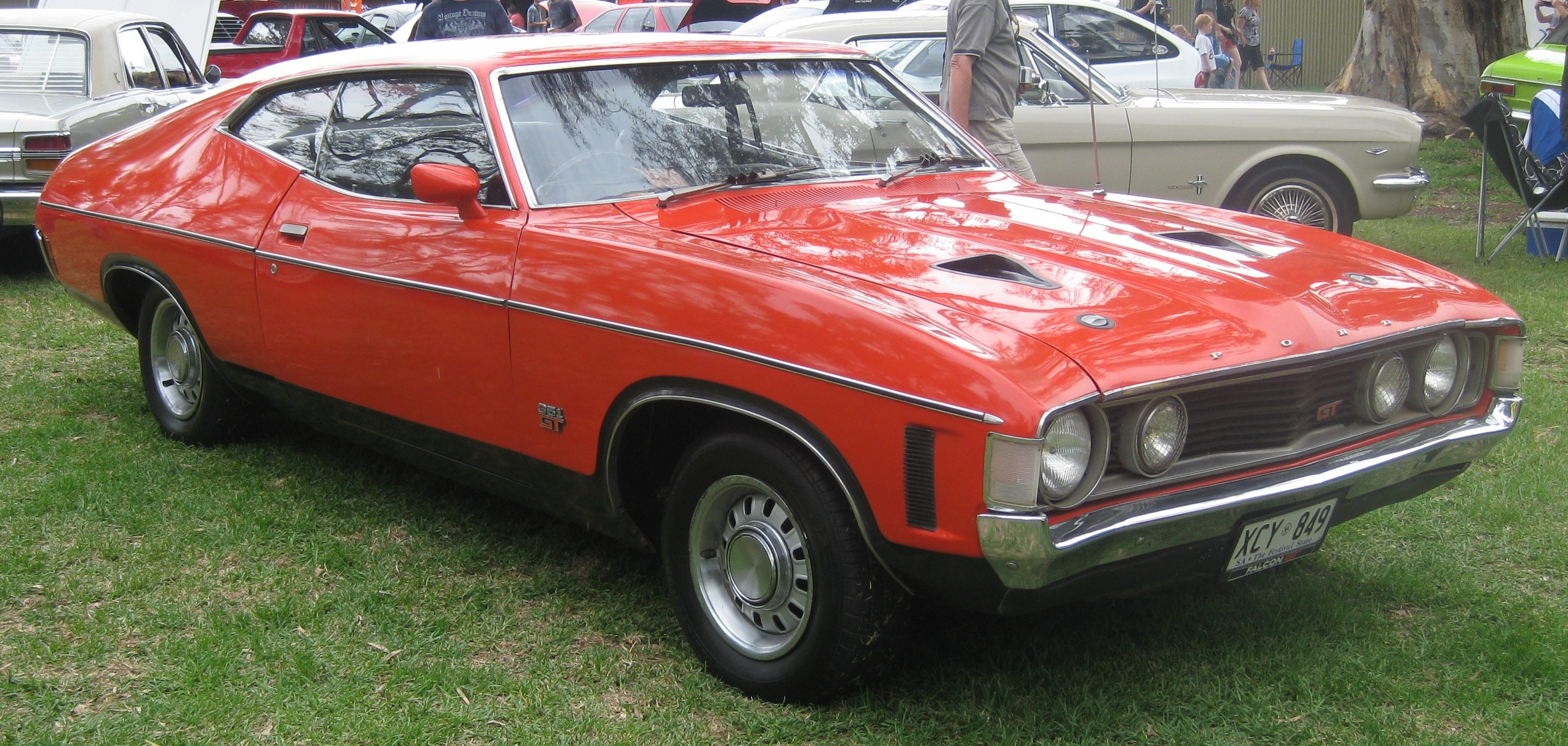
Ford XA Falcon GT Hardtop

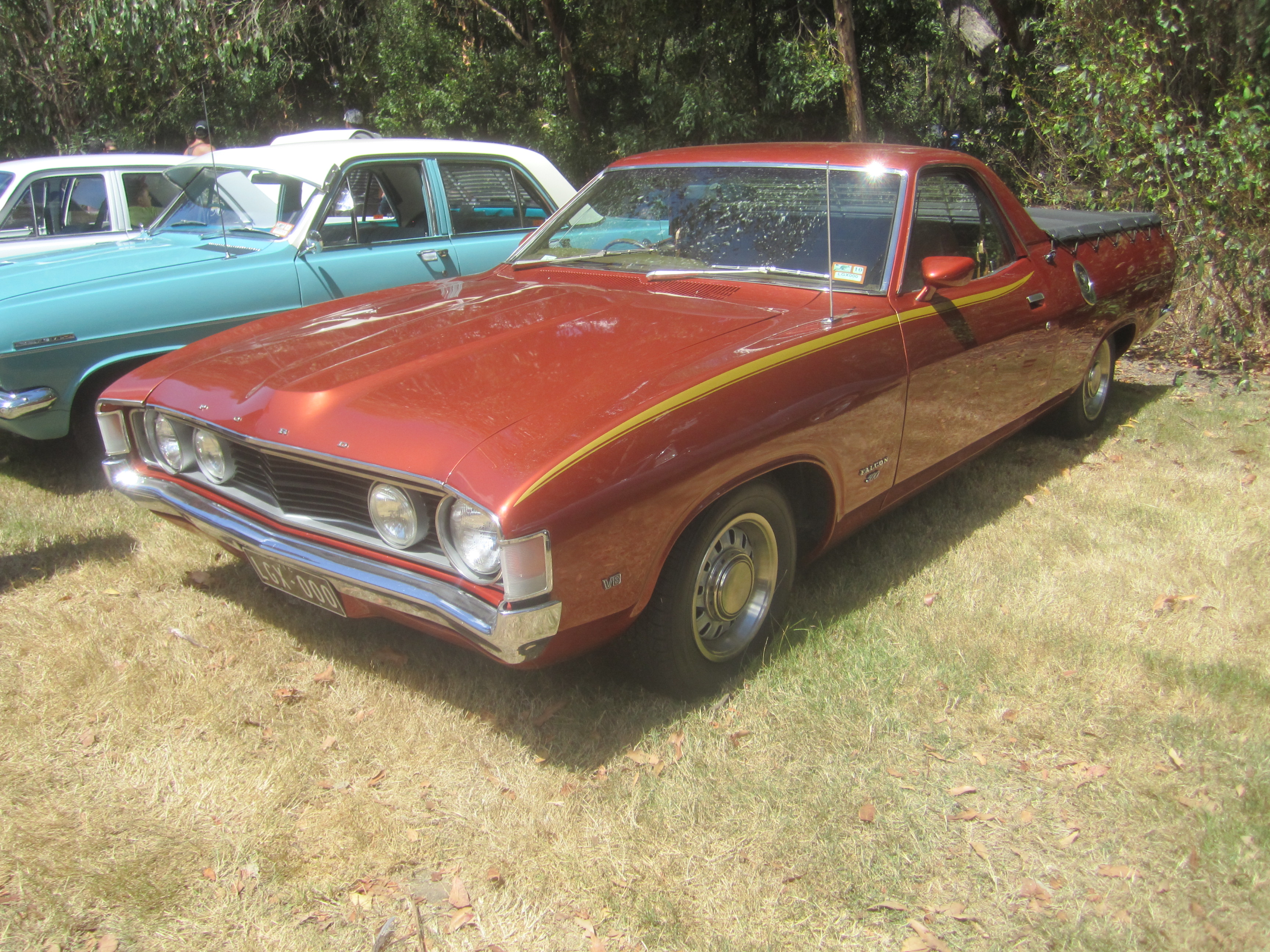
Ford XA Falcon 500 Utility with Grand Sport Rally Pack and additional driving lights

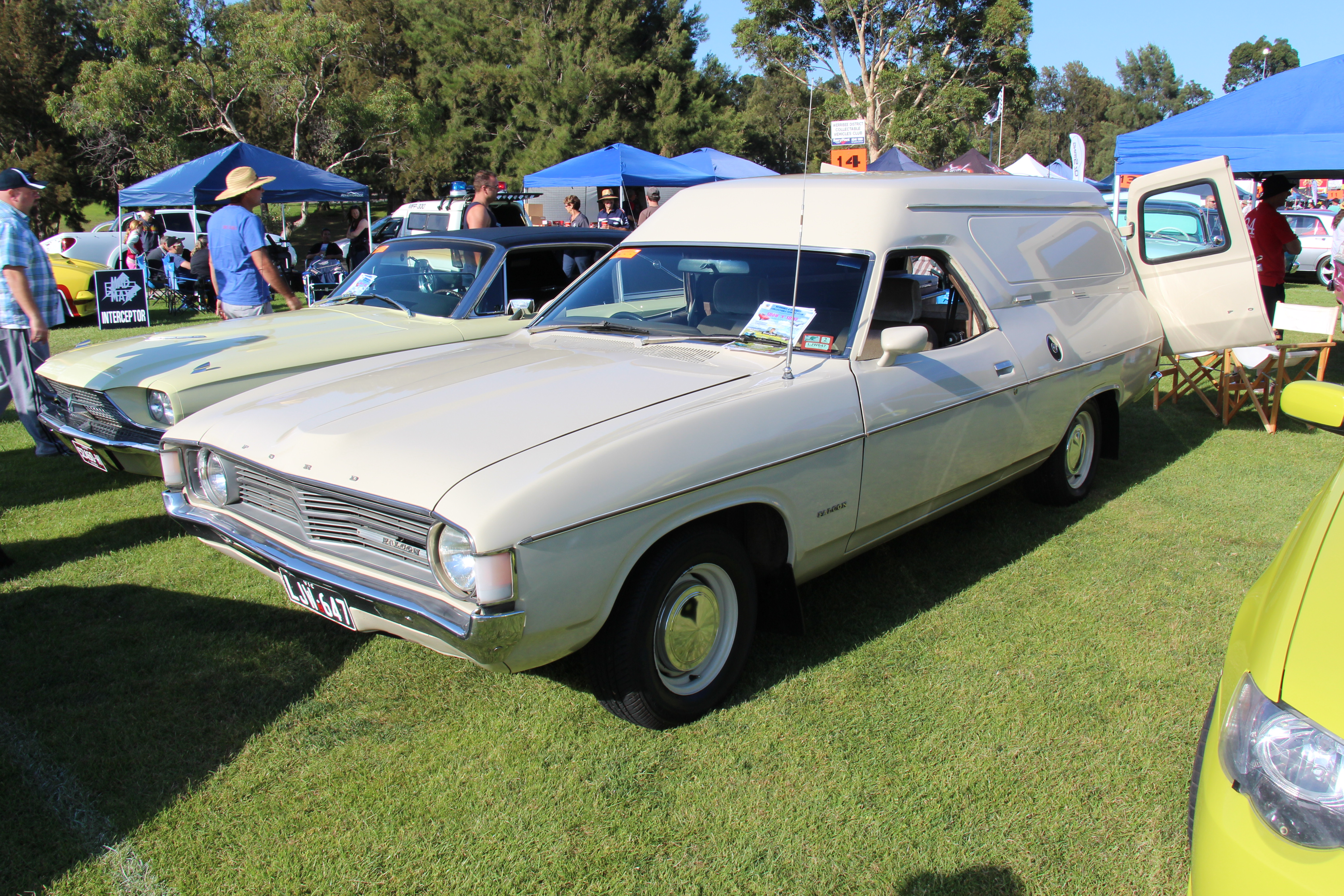
Ford XA Falcon Panel Van

=== Grand Sport Rally Pack ===
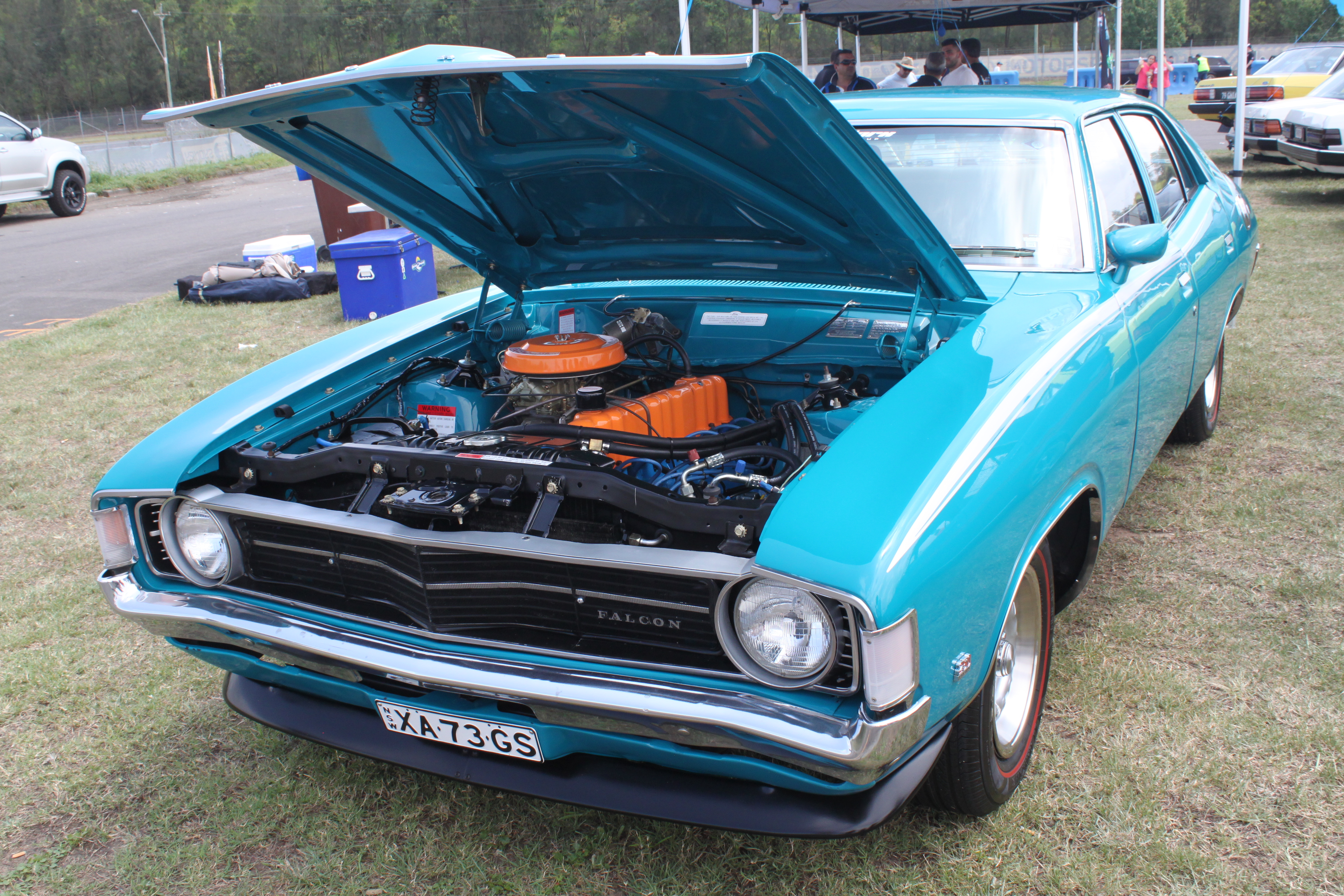
Ford XA Falcon GS, equipped with the special twin-venturi six-cylinder engine

A Grand Sport (GS) Rally Pack was offered on Falcon, Falcon 500 and Fairmont models. The XA GS had rally stripes that ran from the front indicators to the end of the rear doors. It also shared many options as used on the GT Falcon, such as the 12 slot steel wheels with plain brushed centre caps, the three spoke wooden rimmed steering wheel with rim squeeze horn and full GT dash instrumentation featuring tachometer, odometer, oil pressure, water temperature and voltmeter as standard. For the first time the GS model range was also available as a two-door hardtop. The GS package was also offered as an option on utes and panel vans as per XY. The 260 hp (190 kW) two barrel version of the 5.8 L (351 cu in) Cleveland V8 was the largest engine option available. The GS option did not come standard with the Option 56 ‘driving lights’ grille which was standard on the GT, however it was a common addition. The GT bonnet with NACA style ducts was not available as an option on the XA GS.

=== Falcon GTHO Phase IV ===
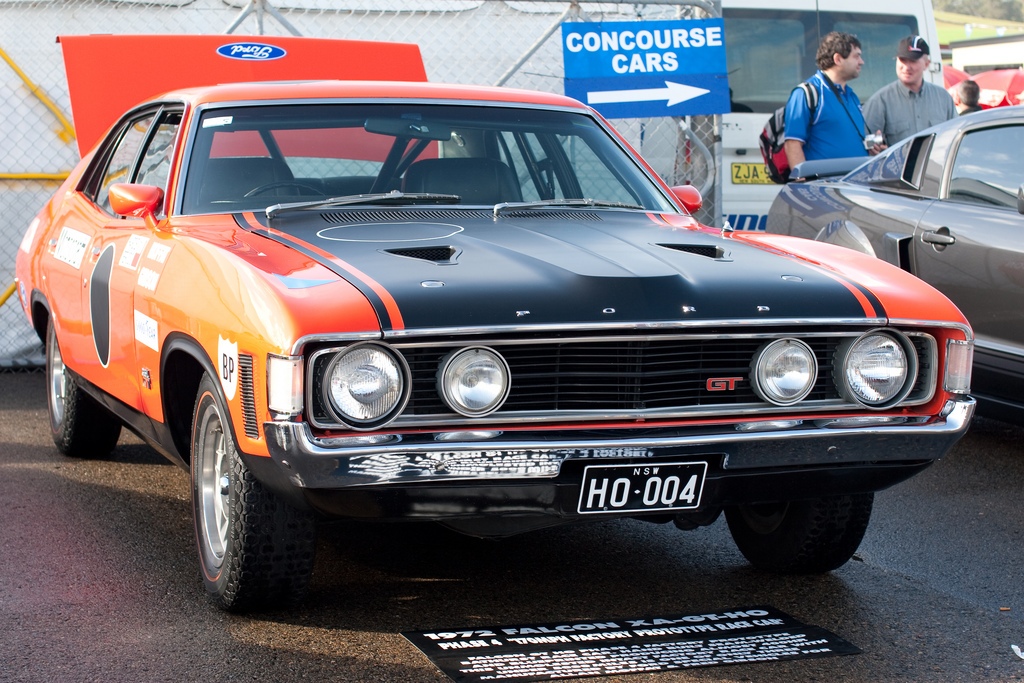
Ford XA Falcon GT-HO Phase IV

As the previous XW and XY series Falcon GT sedans, an extra-high-performance limited-production version of the XA Falcon GT sedan, the GT-HO Phase IV, was developed by Ford Australia for homologation in Group E Series Production Touring Car racing, targeting in particular the 1972 Hardie-Ferodo 500 at Bathurst. Production of the required 200 examples was abandoned in July 1972 following intense media and political pressure, and only one production example was completed. This significant road car was manufactured in Calypso Green metallic with a white vinyl interior, and was delivered to Jack Brabham's Ford dealership in Bankstown. It is privately owned and has recently been completely restored.

Additionally, three regular production Falcon GT sedans - especially painted in Brambles Red - had been in the process of being developed for racing to GT-HO specification by Ford Special Vehicles Division and were to be raced at Bathurst in 1972 by factory drivers Allan Moffat and Fred Gibson. With the abandonment of the XA Falcon GT-HO as a production car, development was immediately halted on the three race cars and they were sold off. However, one of these cars did go on to serve a life in motorsport, specifically as a rally car campaigned by Bruce Hodgson. It was later destroyed in a road accident. Although the three cars featured standard Falcon GT compliance plates, they are considered by most Ford fans to be race-prepared versions of the XA Falcon GT-HO Phase IV.

Howard Marsden, head of Lot 6, designated the race cars as follows XA-1 Allan Moffat (Carthew); XA-2 Gibson (Bowden); XA-3 (Hodgson).

=== Falcon GT - RPO 83 ===
Between April 1973 and August 1973, Ford Australia built 250 XA Falcon GTs fitted with the RPO 83 package, 130 of these being sedans and 120 being hardtops. RPO 83 comprised three variations from the standard XA Falcon GT, these being of a Holley 780 carburettor, 2.25 inch exhaust headers and a clutch slave cylinder hydraulic pipe heat shield. Pricing and external appearance did not vary from the standard models. The 2.25 inch exhaust headers were subsequently homologated for the XA Falcon GT for Group C Touring Car racing, including the 1973 Hardie-Ferodo 1000.

=== Falcon 500 Superbird - RPO 77 ===
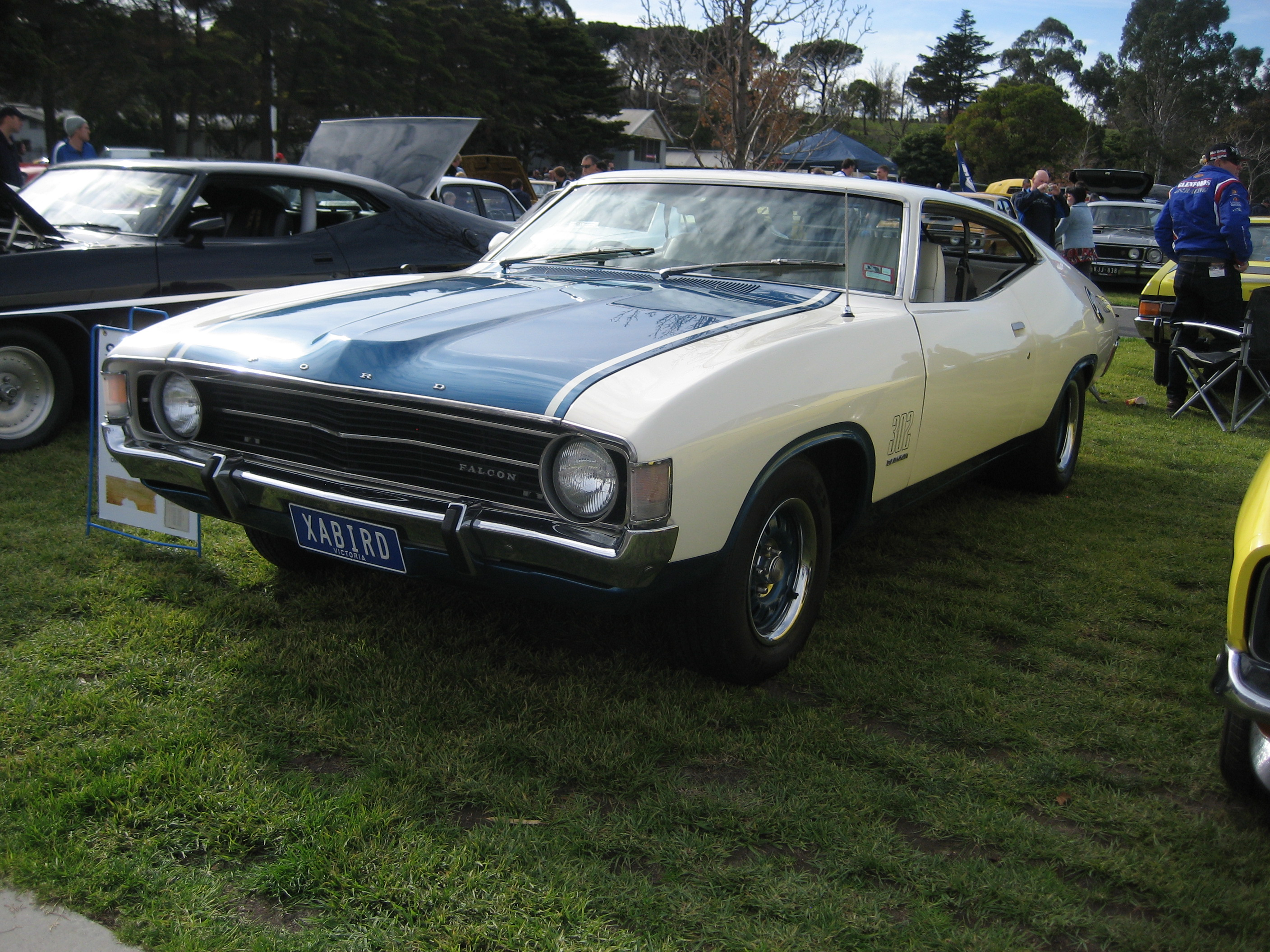
Ford XA Falcon 500 Superbird Hardtop. Pictured in Polar White/Cosmic Blue with correct colour-coded wheel centres

Following the positive public reaction given to its XA Falcon GT Hardtop-based “Superbird” show car at the 1973 Melbourne Motor Show, Ford Australia released a limited production “Superbird” to the public. The production Superbird was an XA Falcon 500 Hardtop fitted with an option package designated as RPO 77. The package included the Australian-built 302 cubic inch Cleveland V8 engine, sports suspension, Grand Sport Rally Pack instrumentation and a rear window louvre. Three contrasting paints schemes matched with colour-coded wheel centres were offered, the choices being Polar White with Cosmic Blue accent, Yellow Fire with Walnut Glow accent and Lime Glaze with Jewel Green accent. Large "Superbird" decals adorned the rear quarter panels and the rear-mounted "Falcon 500" badging was retained. The advertised production run was 750 units; however, the actual production total is thought to have been lower. The entire production run was completed in the months of March through May 1973.

.

== Motorsport ==
Allan Moffat and Ian Geoghegan won the 1973 Hardie-Ferodo 1000 at Bathurst in a factory entered XA Falcon GT Hardtop and John Goss and Kevin Bartlett won the 1974 Hardie-Ferodo 1000 in a privately entered example.

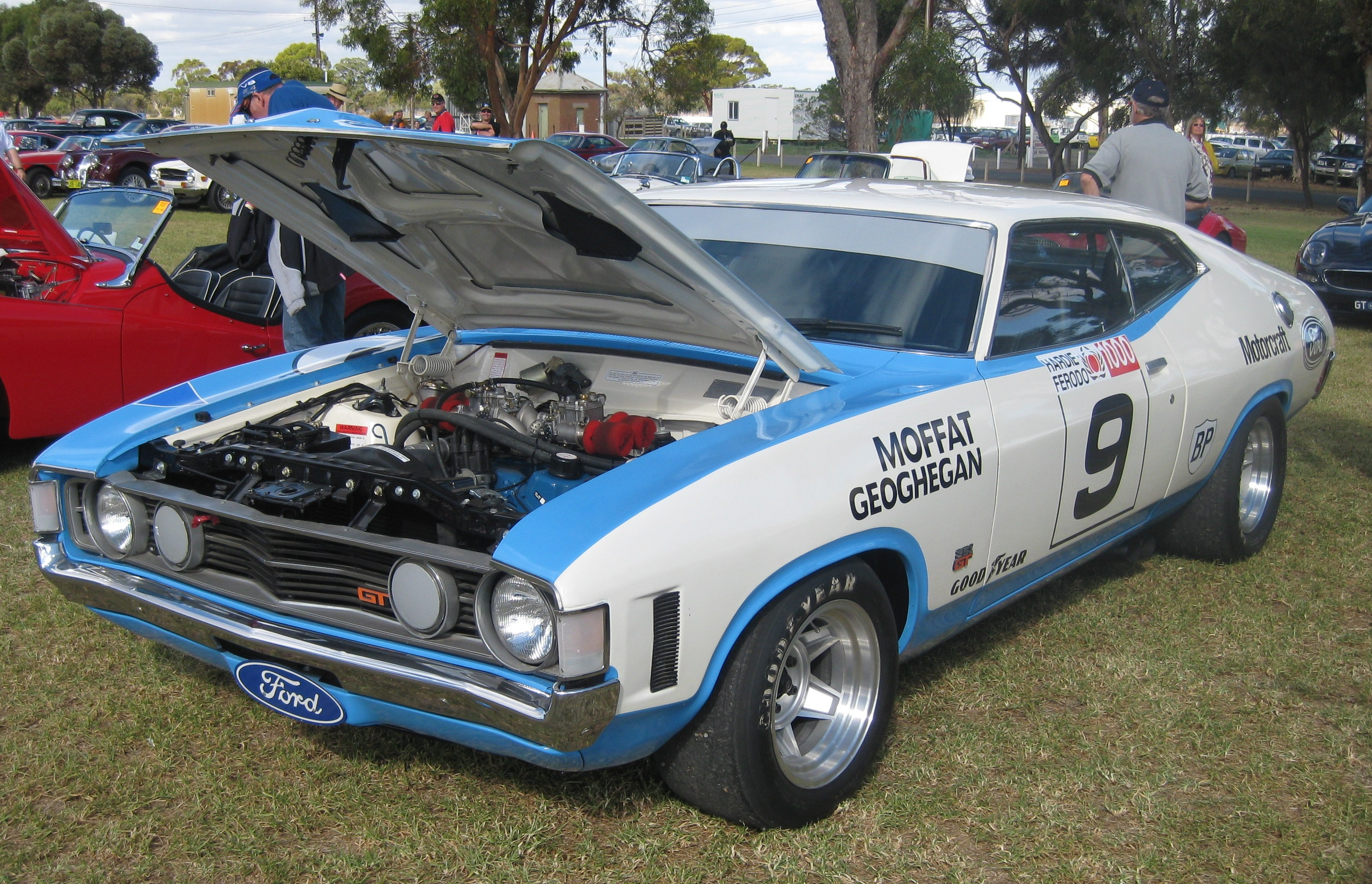
A race replica of the Ford XA Falcon GT Hardtop in which Allan Moffat and Ian Geoghegan won the 1973 Hardie-Ferodo 1000 at Bathurst

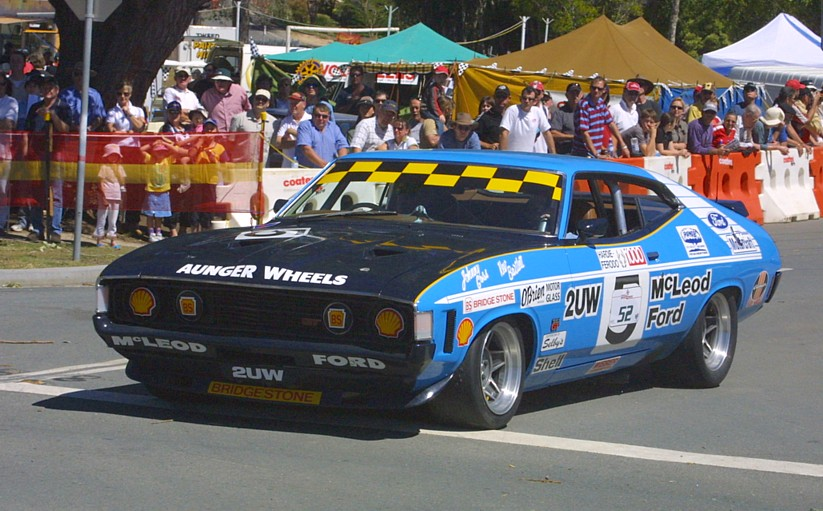
A race replica of the Ford XA Falcon GT Hardtop in which John Goss and Kevin Bartlett won the 1974 Hardie-Ferodo 1000 at Bathurst
