= Supercar scare =

1972 performance vehicle controversy in Australia

The Supercar scare was a national controversy that arose in Australia in 1972 in regard to the sale of high performance homologation special versions of Australian-built passenger cars to the public.

== Background ==
The Hardie-Ferodo 500 (now Bathurst 1000), required racing cars to sell 200 road-going homologation special units to race. Ford Australia won Hardie-Ferodo in 1970 and 1971 with the Ford Falcon GTHO Phase II and III.

== Overview ==
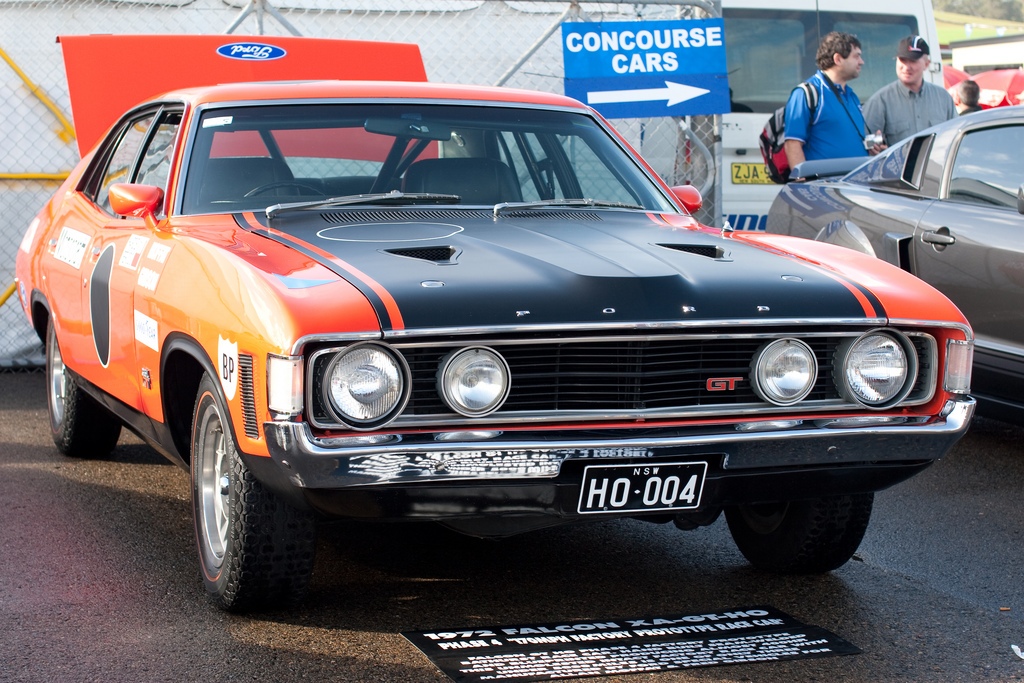
Ford Falcon (XA) GTHO Phase IV

On 25 June 1972 Evan Green published an article in The Sun-Herald newspaper entitled "160 MPH 'Super Cars' Soon". It claimed that the "Big Three" vehicle manufactures, Holden, Ford Australia, and Chrysler Australia were to produce cars reaching 160 mph (257 km/h). The article included quotes from Milton Morris, the New South Wales minister for transport. Morris calling the cars "bullets on wheels" and stated that he was appalled that the cars were able to be sold to the general public.

The article triggered by news of the: Chrsyler Valiant Charger (VH) R/T E55, Ford Falcon (XA) GTHO Phase IV and a V8 version of the Holden LJ Torana GTR XU-1.

== Government response ==
On 28 June 1972 Morris said he would "seek a national ban on such cars". On 29 June 1972 the Queensland minister for transport Keith Hooper called for a "national ban on the registration of popular make high-performance cars capable of speeds in excess of 130 mph". The federal government threatened to not purchase vehicles from manufactures who made a supercar.

== CAMS response ==
In June 1972 Donald Thomson, secretary of Confederation of Australian Motor Sport (CAMS) stated that regulations would be changed to discontinue all "series production car" races and allow manufacturers to race specially modified vehicles derived from a production vehicle. Thomson also said that the Bathurst 500 "had created large problems, one of the greatest of which was the marketing of the 'super-cars'". In 1973 the Group E series was replaced by the Group C series by CAMS.

== Manufacturer response ==
The Ford Falcon (XA) GTHO Phase IV was cancelled, with only the 4 existing units remaining.

Holden cancelled the XU-1 V8.

Chrysler cancelled the performance V8 versions of the Charger.
