= Deaths in August 1993 =

The following is a list of notable deaths in August 1993.

Entries for each day are listed alphabetically by surname. A typical entry lists information in the following sequence:

- Name, age, country of citizenship at birth, subsequent country of citizenship (if applicable), reason for notability, cause of death (if known), and reference.

== August 1993 ==
=== 1 ===
- Bob Carter, 71, American jazz bassist and arranger.
- Claire Du Brey, 100, American actress.
- Elmira Gafarova, 59, Azerbaijani politician and diplomat, heart attack.
- Ron Halcombe, 87, Australian cricketer.
- Ewing Kauffman, 76, American entrepreneur, philanthropist, and baseball executive, bone cancer.
- Alfred Manessier, 81, French painter, stained glass artist, and tapestry designer, traffic collision.
- Luciano Montero, 85, Spanish road bicycle racer.
- Theron Newell, 77, American writer.
- George H. Revercomb, 64, American district judge (United States District Court for the District of Columbia).
- Gerry Sundquist, 37, English actor, suicide.

=== 2 ===
- Guido del Mestri, 82, Italian cardinal of the Catholic Church.
- Archie Fraser, 79, Canadian ice hockey player (New York Rangers).
- Hosai Fujisawa, 74, Japanese professional Go player.
- Nigel Henderson, 84, British admiral in the Royal Navy.
- Kamal Mitra, 80, Indian actor.
- John Roxburgh, 61, Australian racing driver, and motor sports administrator.
- Janusz Sidło, 60, Polish javelin thrower and Olympic medalist (1952, 1956, 1960, 1964, 1968).

=== 3 ===
- Petr Beckmann, 68, Czechoslovak-American writer and physicist.
- Vittorio Badini Confalonieri, 79, Italian politician and lawyer.
- James Donald, 76, Scottish actor (The Bridge on the River Kwai, The Great Escape, The Vikings), stomach cancer.
- Alwyn Howard Gentry, 48, American botanist and plant collector, plane crash.
- Siem Heiden, 88, Dutch Olympic speed skater (1928).
- Prem Krishna Khanna, 99, Indian revolutionary and politician.
- Ernie Norman, 80, Australian rugby player.
- Theodore A. Parker III, 40, American ornithologist, plane crash.
- Chinmayananda Saraswati, 77, Indian Hindu spiritual leader and teacher.
- Mercedes Valdivieso, 69, Chilean writer.

=== 4 ===
- Nesmith Ankeny, 66, American mathematician.
- Bernard Barrow, 65, American actor (Ryan's Hope, Serpico, Rachel, Rachel), lung cancer.
- Kenny Drew, 64, American jazz pianist.
- Jack Dwan, 72, American basketball player (Minneapolis Lakers).
- John Elmer, 88, Australian rules footballer.
- Bob Maier, 77, American baseball player (Detroit Tigers).
- John Pickard, 80, American actor (Boots and Saddles, True Grit, Gunslinger), animal attack.
- George M. Wallhauser, 93, American politician, member of the United States House of Representatives (1959-1965).

=== 5 ===
- Bob Cooper, 67, American jazz musician, heart attack.
- Randy Jo Hobbs, 45, American musician, heart failure.
- Homer A. Jack, 77, American unitarian clergyman, pacifist and social activist.
- Joseph Paul Jernigan, 39, American convicted murderer, execution by lethal injection.
- Karin Nellemose, 88, Danish actress.
- Bill Peterson, 73, American football player and coach.
- Holly Piirainen, 10, American murder victim.
- Francisco Rúa, 82, Argentine football player.
- Willi Sturm, 65, German Olympic water polo player (1952, 1956).
- Eugen Suchoň, 84, Slovak composer.

=== 6 ===
- Frog Fagan, 52, Canadian racing driver.
- Tex Hughson, 77, American Major League Baseball player (Boston Red Sox).
- Vice Jurišić, 84, Yugoslavian Olympic rower (1936).
- Bob Kiesel, 81, American sprinter and Olympic champion (1932).
- Ben Klassen, 75, American politician and white supremacist religious leader, suicide.
- Esad Mekuli, 76, Albanian poet, critic and translator.
- Bob Miller, 54, American baseball player.
- Henri Philippe Pharaoun, 92, Lebanese businessman and politician, homicide.
- Milton Orville Thompson, 67, American naval officer and NASA test pilot.
- Bill Thomson, 79, Canadian ice hockey player (Detroit Red Wings), and Olympian (1936).

=== 7 ===
- Geert Bakker, 72, Dutch sailor and Olympian (1976, 1980).
- Roy Budd, 46, British jazz pianist and composer, stroke.
- John R. Burke, 68, American ambassador to Guyana during the Jonestown Massacre.
- David Fleay, 86, Australian scientist and naturalist.
- Charles Maxwell, 79, American actor and producer.
- Gerhard Neuser, 54, German footballer.
- Louis Sheaffer, 80, American journalist and winner of the Pulitzer Prize, heart failure.

=== 8 ===
- Harry Bellaver, 88, American actor, pneumonia.
- Nico Habermann, 61, Dutch computer scientist, heart attack.
- Roy London, 50, American actor and acting coach, AIDS-related complications.
- Andor László, 78, Hungarian economist.

=== 9 ===
- Elena Fabrizi, 78, Italian actress and television personality.
- Milorad Mitrović, 85, Yugoslavian Olympic football player (1928).
- Chad Oliver, 65, American anthropologist and science fiction writer.
- Ion Vatamanu, 56, Moldovan writer and politician.

=== 10 ===
- Audrey Chapman, 94, American silent film era actress.
- Ken Englund, 79, American screenwriter.
- Euronymous, 25, Norwegian musician of the black metal band Mayhem, stabbed.
- Bill Ferrazzi, 86, American baseball player (Philadelphia Athletics).
- Diana Holman-Hunt, 79, English memoir writer and art critic.
- Bert Johnson, 81, American football player.
- Eva Olmerová, 59, Czech pop and jazz singer, cirrhosis.
- David Rogers, 57, American country music artist.
- Quincy Trouppe, 80, American baseball player and an amateur boxing champion.

=== 11 ===
- Alyn Beals, 72, American gridiron football player (San Francisco 49ers).
- Agamemnon Gratsios, 71, Greek Army general.
- Eysteinn Jónsson, 86, Icelandic politician and minister.
- Bill Wilson, 50, American baseball player (Philadelphia Phillies), cancer.

=== 12 ===
- Ken Deal, 65, American baseball player and manager.
- John H. Dessauer, 88, German-American chemical engineer and businessman.
- Regina Olson Hughes, 98, American scientific illustrator in botanical art.
- Jack Lott, 73, American big game hunter and writer.
- George Mason, 79, English football player.
- Jerome Thor, 78, American actor.

=== 13 ===
- Bride Adams-Ray, 86, Swedish Olympic high jumper (1928).
- Veli Autio, 83, Finnish rower and Olympian (1948).
- Henri Baudrand, 90, French Olympic weightlifter (1928).
- Jackson Edward Betts, 89, American politician, member of the United States House of Representatives (1951-1973).
- Barbara Gibbs Golffing, 80, American poet and translator.
- Fred Grafft, 81, American basketball player.
- Frank Gray, 87, Australian rugby league footballer.
- Helene Jacobs, 87, German resistance member during World War II.
- Margarita Padín, 83, Argentine actress.
- Rodolfo Tommasi, 85, Italian football player.

=== 14 ===
- Jiří Adamíra, 67, Czech actor and university educator.
- June Heath, 64, Australian Olympic javelin thrower (1956).
- Hans Henn, 66, German bobsledder and Olympian (1956).
- Francis Mankiewicz, 49, Canadian film director, screenwriter and producer, cancer.
- André Méric, 80, French politician, traffic collision.
- Günther van Well, 70, German diplomat and West German ambassador.

=== 15 ===
- Jim Bolwell, 81, Australian rules footballer.
- Johnny Bratton, 65, American boxing champion.
- Arthur Grenfell Clarke, 86, Hong Kong politician.
- Patricia St. John, 74, English writer.
- Robert Kempner, 93, German-American lawyer.
- Kalevi Lilja, 67, Finnish football player and Olympian (1952).
- Bob McCulley, 81, Canadian ice hockey player (Montreal Canadiens).
- Hans Nordahl, 75, Norwegian football player.
- Nathán Pinzón, 76, Argentine actor, heart attack.

=== 16 ===
- Abd al-A'la al-Sabziwari, 81, Iranian-Iraqi Shia Grand Ayatollah.
- Jacob D. Beam, 85, American diplomat.
- René Dreyfus, 88, French racecar driver.
- Ernest Fernyhough, 84, British politician.
- Tom Fuccello, 56, American actor (Love Is a Many Splendored Thing, Dallas, Mac and Me), AIDS-related complications.
- Stewart Granger, 80, British film actor, cancer.
- Joan Hughes, 75, English test pilot and stunt performer.
- Kitty Joyner, 77, American electrical engineer with the NACA and NASA.
- Bama Rowell, 77, American baseball player (Boston Bees/Braves, Philadelphia Phillies).
- Irene Sharaff, 83, American costume designer (West Side Story, Cleopatra, An American in Paris), five-time Oscar winner, heart failure.
- Ethelwynn Trewavas, 92, British ichthyologist.

=== 17 ===
- Max Gebhardt, 89, German Olympic long-distance runner (1936).
- Feng Kang, 72, Chinese mathematician.
- Robert C. Maynard, 56, American journalist and newspaper publisher, prostate cancer.
- Phil Seymour, 41, American musician, lymphoma.
- Al Sima, 71, American baseball player (Washington Senators, Chicago White Sox, Philadelphia Athletics).

=== 18 ===
- Tony Barwick, 59, British television scriptwriter, cancer.
- Heinrich Hess, 65, German Olympic canoeist (1952).
- Daisy Lumini, 57, Italian composer, singer and stage actress, suicide.
- Tino Schirinzi, 59, Italian actor and stage director, suicide.
- Paweł Stok, 80, Polish basketball player and Olympian (1936).

=== 19 ===
- Lucinda Ballard, 87, American costume designer (The Gay Life, Another Part of the Forest, A Streetcar Named Desire), Tony winner (1947, 1962), cancer.
- Iris Faircloth Blitch, 81, American politician.
- Mal Drury, 83, Australian rules footballer.
- Utpal Dutt, 64, Indian actor, director, and playwright.
- Gérard Hérold, 53, French actor, heart attack.
- Salah Jadid, 67, Syrian general and politician, heart attack.
- Donald William Kerst, 81, American physicist.
- Bob L. Miller, 69, Australian rules footballer.

=== 20 ===
- Tony Barton, 56, English football player and football manager, heart attack.
- Koos de Jong, 81, Dutch sailor and Olympic medalist (1948, 1952).
- William J. Murphy, 81, American politician.
- Reiner Schürmann, 52, German Dominican priest and philosopher, AIDS-related complications.
- Viktor Torshin, 45, Russian Olympic sport shooter (1972, 1976).

=== 21 ===
- Bert Ashby, 84, Australian rules footballer.
- Louis Cools-Lartigue, 88, Dominican politician.
- Paula Deubel, 58, American shot putter and Olympian (1956).
- Felix Evans, 82, American baseball player.
- Ichirō Fujiyama, 82, Japanese singer and composer.
- Graeme Jennings, 47, Australian Olympic fencer (1968).
- Kasdi Merbah, 55, Algerian politician, murdered.
- Vera Romanić, 82, Yugoslavian Olympic sprinter (1936).
- Tatiana Troyanos, 54, American mezzo-soprano, breast cancer.

=== 22 ===
- Eddie Chiles, 83, American businessman and baseball executive.
- Dinmukhamed Konayev, 81, Soviet and Kazakhstan communist politician.
- Len Pigg, 73, American baseball player.
- R. Gundu Rao, 56, Indian politician, leukemia .
- Halsey Royden, 64, American mathematician, heart attack.
- Yoshiko Shigekane, 66, Japanese writer.

=== 23 ===
- Gregory Gaye, 92, Russian-American actor.
- Piero Parini, 98, Italian journalist and politician.
- Edvard Ravnikar, 85, Slovenian architect.
- Jim Reninger, 78, American baseball player (Philadelphia Athletics).
- Charles Scorsese, 80, American actor (Raging Bull, Goodfellas, The Color of Money).

=== 24 ===
- George Cansdale, 83, British zoologist, writer and television personality.
- Ruben Cantu, 26, American convicted murderer, execution by lethal injection.
- Leopoldo Contarbio, 64, Argentine basketball player and Olympian (1948, 1952).
- D. B. Deodhar, 101, Indian cricket player.
- Jack Gaudion, 83, Australian rules footballer.
- Boris Levin, 86, Soviet and Russian mathematician.
- David Mason, 36, American serial killer, execution by gas chamber.
- Albert Joseph McConnell, 89, Irish mathematician and mathematical physicist.

=== 25 ===
- Janna Allen, 36, American songwriter, leukemia.
- Amy Biehl, 26, American anti-Apartheid activist, homicide.
- Cecil Bolton, 89, American baseball player (Cleveland Indians).
- Tom Gallery, 95, American film actor and sports promoter.
- Lawrence Kadoorie, Baron Kadoorie, 94, Hong Kong industrialist, photographer and philanthropist.
- Boris Moishezon, 55, Soviet and Russian mathematician, heart attack.
- Macauley Smith, 88, American long-distance runner and Olympian (1928).
- Henri Steenacker, 67, Belgian rower and Olympian (1952, 1956).
- Arthur Stott, 83, Canadian Olympic diver (1932).

=== 26 ===
- Karl Bewerunge, 80, German politician.
- Jean Carmen, 80, American film, stage, and radio actress.
- Rockin' Dopsie, 61, American zydeco singer and accordion player, heart attack.
- Jack Maher, 77, Australian rules footballer.
- Roy Raymond, 46, American businessman and founder of Victoria's Secret, suicide.
- Alan Wharton, 70, English cricket player.

=== 27 ===
- Rafael Alcayde, 86, Mexican film actor.
- Wolfgang Helck, 78, German egyptologist and writer.
- José Marante, 78, Argentine football player.
- Hazen McAndrew, 76, Canadian ice hockey player (Brooklyn Americans).
- Gene Thomas, 50, American gridiron football player (Kansas City Chiefs, Boston Patriots), cardiomyopathy.
- Archie Wilcox, 90, Canadian ice hockey defenceman (Montreal Maroons, Boston Bruins, St. Louis Eagles).

=== 28 ===
- George Appleton, 91, British Anglican bishop and writer.
- Bernie Baum, 63, American songwriter.
- Frank Hill, 87, Scottish football player and manager.
- Rene Ray, Countess of Midleton, 81, British stage and screen actress and novelist.
- Paul Rowe, 79, American Olympic ice hockey player (1936).
- William Stafford, 79, American poet and pacifist.
- E. P. Thompson, 69, English historian, writer, socialist and pacifist.

=== 29 ===
- Dorian Corey, 56, American drag performer and fashion designer, AIDS-related complications.
- Jack Hueller, 94, American football player.
- Luciano Marion, 64, Italian Olympic rower (1952).
- Roger McCluskey, 63, American IndyCar racing driver, cancer.
- Carlos Santiago Nino, 49, Argentine philosopher, asthma.
- Gwendoline Porter, 91, British track and field athlete and Olympic medalist (1932).
- Jerre Stockton Williams, 77, American circuit judge (United States Court of Appeals for the Fifth Circuit).

=== 30 ===
- Ian Folley, 30, English cricket player, heart attack.
- Richard Jordan, 56, American actor (Logan's Run, Dune, The Hunt for Red October), brain cancer.
- Anthony Plowman, 87, British judge.
- Milos Žutić, 53, Serbian actor.

=== 31 ===
- Jess Hill, 86, American baseball player, athlete, and coach, Alzheimer's disease.
- Stella Kramrish, 97, American art historian and curator.
- Stuart Latham, 81, English actor, director and television producer.
- Ligorio López, 60, Mexican football player.
- Alexander Nekrich, 73, Soviet and Russian historian.
- Siegfried Schürenberg, 93, German film actor.
- Al Trace, 92, American songwriter and orchestra leader, stroke.

== Sources ==
- Liebman, Roy (2000). The Wampas Baby Stars: A Biographical Dictionary, 1922–1934. Jefferson, North Carolina: McFarland. ISBN 0-7864-0756-5.
