= 1962 Six Hour Le Mans =

The 1962 Six Hour Le Mans was an endurance motor race for Sports Cars, Sedans and GT cars. The event was held at the Caversham circuit in Western Australia on 3 June 1962. There were a total of 31 starters in the race, which was the eighth Six Hour Le Mans.

The race was won by Derek Jolly and John Roxburgh driving a Lotus 15 Coventry Climax.

== Results ==
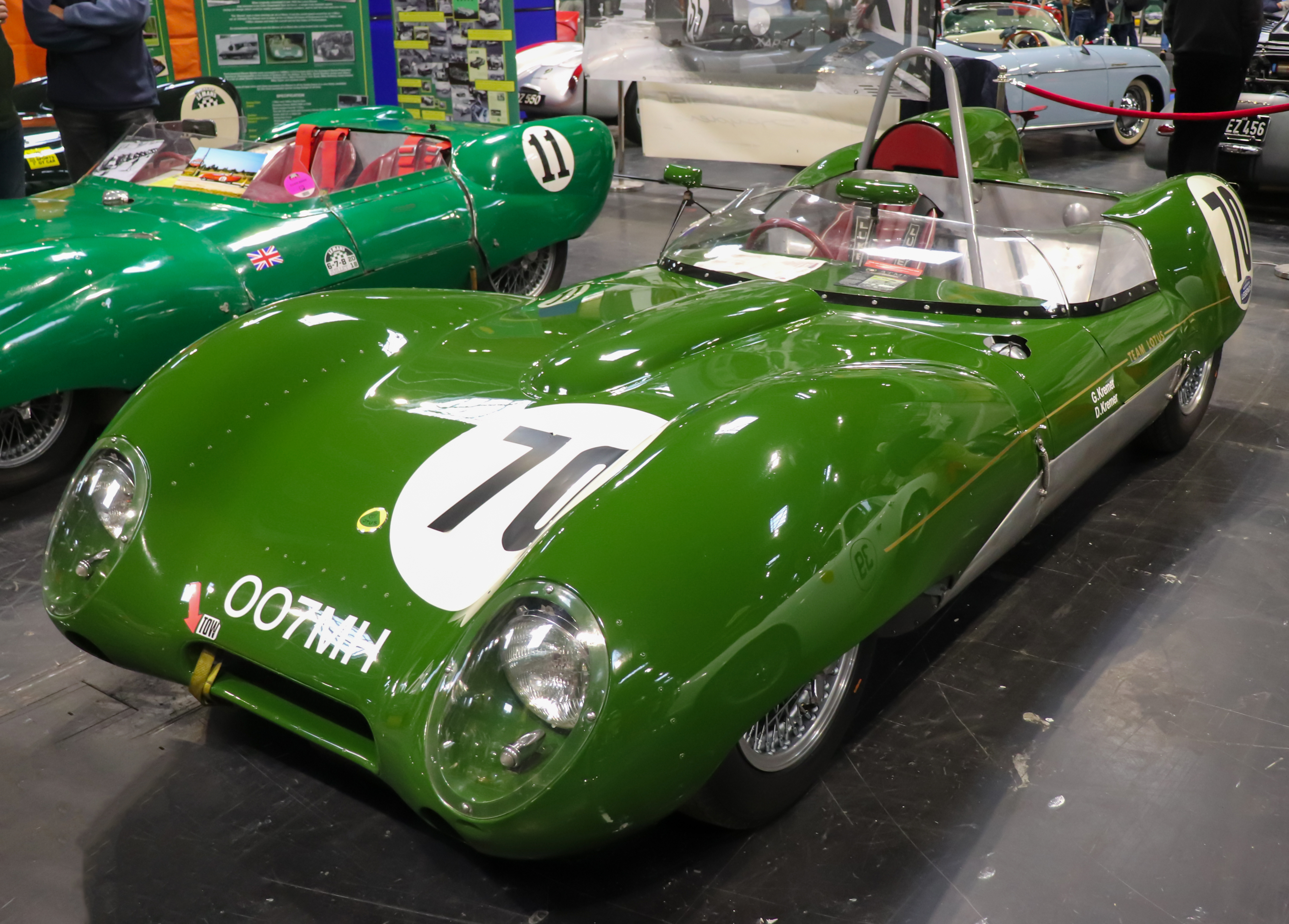
Derek Jolly and John Roxburgh won the race driving a Lotus 15, similar to the car pictured above.

Position	Drivers	No.	Car	Entrant	Class position	Laps
1	Derek Jolly; John Roxburgh	4	Lotus 15 Coventry Climax	Lotus Australia Ltd	1st Sports Under 2600cc	185
2	Dave Sullivan	40	Holden	D. Sullivan	1st Sedan Under 2600cc	177
3	George Wakelin	42	Holden	G. Wakelin	2nd Sedan Under 2600cc	173
4	Mike Tighe	47	Fiat 1500	Reimann Motors	1st Sedan Under 1600cc	172
5	Ian Johnson; Bob McDowall	38	Austin-Healey Sprite	F. Johnston	1st Sports Under 1000cc	169
6	Bill Inwood	44	Simca	W. Inwood	1st Sedan Under 1300cc	166
7	J. Sumpton	29	Chrysler Valiant	Motorland	1st Sedan Over 2600cc	166
8	Jeff Dunkerton	26	Austin-Healey Sprite	J. Wynhoff Motors	2nd Sports Under 1000cc	164
9	Wally Higgs; Brian McKay	11	Peugeot	Wally Higgs	2nd Sedan Under 1600cc	158
10	Jack Wynhoff; Bob Annear	12	Renault Gordini	Maison Motors	1st Sedan Under 850cc	158
11	Frank Coad; John Roxburgh	5	Lotus Seven Coventry Climax		1st Sports Under 1600cc	158
12	Rod Mitchell	32	Volkswagen Karmann Ghia		2nd Sedan Under 1300cc	157
13	R. Gillett; R. Thompson	16	Morris Major		3rd Sedan Under 1600cc	156
14	R. Downey; J. Harwood	10	MGA Twin Cam		2nd Sports Under 1600cc	156
15	E. Williams; B. Lemon	49	Volkswagen		Sedan	155
16	L. Nowland; G. Chapman	62	Jaguar XK120		1st Sports Over 2600cc	149
17	S. Campbell	45	Goggomobil		Sports	131
18	R. Bolton	15	Standard Vanguard		3rd Sedan Under 2600cc	131
19	Bob Biltoff; Warren Matthews	1	Peugeot		4th Sedan Under 2600cc	118
20	Syd Negus; K. Wilkinson	25	Plymouth Sports		Sports	96
21	Ray Barfield	8	Aston Martin DB3S		Sports	73
DNF	Harley Pederick; Stan Starcevich	64	Holden		Sedan	145
DNF	Vic Watson; Rod Donovan	65	Ford Custom 272		GT	106
DNF	H. Van Laanan	33	Austin-Healey		Sports	86
DNF	Ray Clarke; Rod Donovan	2	Holden		Sedan	75
DNF	Lionel Beattie	9	Repco Holden Sports		Sports	63
DNF	Wileyman; T. Neede	43	Simca		Sedan	61
DNF	A. Visich; R. Booth	24	Holden		Sedan	48
DNF	John Glasson	21	Austin Lancer		Sedan	34
DNF	Tom Purvan	48	Goggomobil Dart		Sports	-
DNF	Dick Roberts; Bob Avery	70	Holden GT		GT	-
