= Bolwell (surname) =

Bolwell is a surname. Notable people with the surname include:

- Jan Bolwell (born 1949), New Zealand playwright, choreographer, dancer and teacher of dance
- Jim Bolwell (1911–1993), Australian rules footballer
- Samantha Bolwell (born 1993), British ice hockey player

== See also ==
- Boswell (surname)
