= Jack Maher =

Jack Maher may refer to:

- Jack Maher (soccer) (born 1999), American soccer player
- Jack Maher (Australian footballer) (1916–1993), Australian rules footballer
