= Bathurst 1000 =

Annual 1,000 km touring car race in Australia

(New South Wales) Bathurst 1000
- Race Information
Venue	Mount Panorama Circuit
Number of times held	69
First held	1960
- Race Format
- Race 1
Laps	161
Distance	1,000.29 km
- Last Event (2026)
- Overall Winner
(Australia) Brodie Kostecki (Australia) Todd Hazelwood	Dick Johnson Racing
- Race Winners
(Australia) Brodie Kostecki (Australia) Todd Hazelwood	Dick Johnson Racing

The Bathurst 1000 (known for sponsorship reasons as the Repco Bathurst 1000) is a 1,000.29 kilometres (621.6 mi) touring car race held annually on the Mount Panorama Circuit in Bathurst, New South Wales, Australia. It is run as part of the Supercars Championship, the most recent incarnation of the Australian Touring Car Championship. In 1987 it was a round of the World Touring Car Championship. The Bathurst 1000 is colloquially known as The Great Race among motorsport fans and media. The race originated with the 1960 Armstrong 500 with a 500 mile race distance at the Phillip Island Grand Prix Circuit; it was relocated to Bathurst in 1963 also with the 500 mile distance and has continued there every year since, extending to a 1,000 kilometre race in 1973 as a result of the Australian metrication efforts. The race was traditionally run on the New South Wales Labour-Day long weekend in early October. Since 2001, the race has been run on the weekend following the long weekend, generally the second weekend of October.

Race winners are presented with the Peter Brock Trophy, introduced at the 2006 race after the sudden death of Peter Brock in an accident. Brock was the most successful driver in the race's history, winning the event nine times. He was also known as one of the most popular and fan-friendly drivers during his long career, and was given the moniker "King of the Mountain" for these reasons.

== Mount Panorama ==
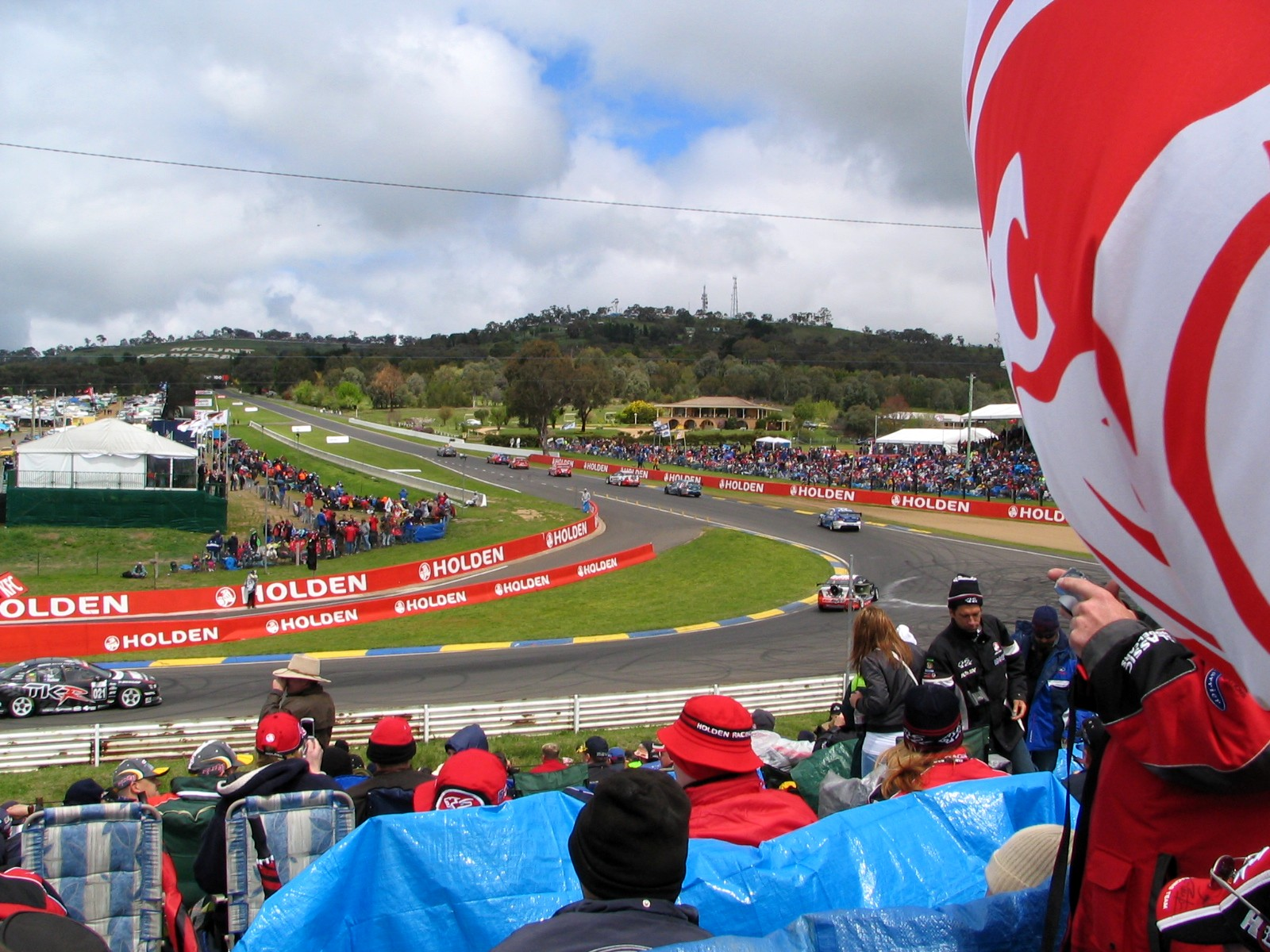
The first corner at Mount Panorama, known as Hell Corner.

The Mount Panorama Circuit was first used on 16 April 1938 for the Australian Tourist Trophy meeting for motorcycles, followed two days later by the Australian Grand Prix for cars. The track uses temporarily-closed-public roads and is known for the 174-metre (571 ft) elevation between its highest and lowest points. The first turn, Hell Corner, is a ninety-degree left-hander. Mountain Straight, a gentle climb where cars reach speeds of 255 km/h (158 mph), leads into Griffin's Bend, an off-camber right-hander that leads into The Cutting, a sharp left-hander with a steep incline. A complex corner called Reid Park comes next, where a number of drivers have spun after not short shifting at the apex. The course continues down to Sulman Park and McPhillamy Park. Drivers are unable to see the descending road and enter Skyline and the first of The Esses at 220 km/h (140 mph) before The Dipper, one of the most famous corners in Australian motorsport. Cars then negotiate Forrest's Elbow before powering down Conrod Straight, the fastest section of the track where cars can reach 300 km/h (190 mph). The Chase is a long sweeping chicane where cars are on the rev limiter turning at 300 km/h before a large braking zone to exit at 130 km/h (81 mph). Murray's is the 23rd and final turn, and also the slowest part of the circuit, before cars return to the start-finish straight. The start-finish straight features an offset start, with the finish line towards the back of the starting grid closer to Murray's Corner.

Spectator areas have spread along the track over the decades, but there are several private properties bordering the track; spectators are therefore unable to access every trackside vantage point. Spectator vantage points have also become less intimate to the track over recent years because of debris fencing and increased run-off dimensions installed to meet upgraded international FIA standards.

== Categories and marques ==
During its history, the race has been conducted for production saloon cars, Group E Series Production Touring Cars, Group C Touring Cars, Group A Touring Cars, Group 3A Touring Cars, Super Touring, and currently Supercars. Until 1995 more than one class competed in each event. In its early years, the Bathurst 500/1000 was generally a stand-alone event, occasionally becoming a round of a national series such as the Australian Manufacturers' Championship, but never part of the most significant touring car series in Australia, the Australian Touring Car Championship. Since 1999, the race has been run exclusively as a championship-points round of the Supercars category. In 1999 and 2000, it was the final round of the championship and on both occasions decided the championship winner. The race was once again the final round of the season in 2020, with the re-organised season having been cut short because of the COVID-19 pandemic, though the championship had already been decided on points.

Many marques — including Morris, Jaguar, Nissan, BMW and Volvo — have competed in and won the event in Bathurst. However, the race is best known for the presence of the traditional rivals of Australian motorsport, Ford and Holden, which have won all but six races. Owing to the magnitude of the Ford-versus-Holden rivalry, for the Bathurst 1000 races from 1995 to 2012 the rules of Group 3A and later V8 Supercars mandated that only Ford Falcons and Holden Commodores were allowed to compete. In 2013, V8 Supercars' rules changed and other marques began to enter the race, including the return of past winners Nissan. Holden has the most overall victories at 34, followed by Ford with 21; Nissan is the only other multiple winner with 2 wins.

== Race history ==
=== Phillip Island ===
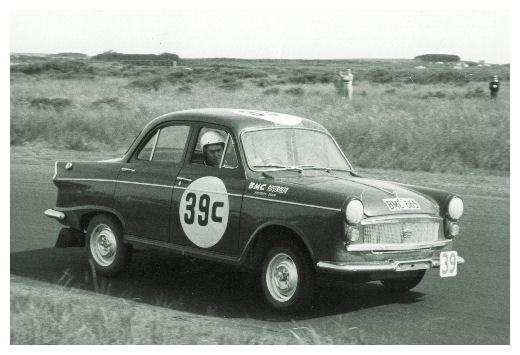
The Austin Lancer of Brian Foley and Alan Edney during the 1960 race.

Originally known as the Armstrong 500, the race was first held on 20 November 1960 at the Phillip Island Grand Prix Circuit in Phillip Island, Victoria, over a 500-mile (800 km) distance. The organisers, the Light Car Club of Australia, claimed the race was 'the world's premier production saloon car race'. The intention was to determine which cars, across five classes based on engine capacity, had the best combination of performance and reliability. It was also a showcase for the Armstrong company's shock absorbers and related products. Entry was limited to standard, unmodified production saloons built or assembled in Australia. All cars had to complete the first 100 miles without stopping for fuel, oil, or a driver change. Any mechanical problems in that time had to be resolved unassisted by the driver, using only the tools that came with the car. There was no official outright winner, only class winners. Frank Coad and John Roxburgh, in a Vauxhall Cresta, were the first to complete the 500-mile race distance. It was the only Vauxhall in the field of 45 cars including N.S.U.s, Simcas, Peugeots, Morris, Austins, Fords and Standard Vanguards.

The race was held twice more at Phillip Island. In 1961 Bob Jane and Harry Firth, sharing an Australian assembled Mercedes-Benz 220 SE, were the first drivers to complete the 167 laps. They were over a lap ahead of the Studebaker Lark driven by David McKay and Brian Foley, which in turn was a lap clear of the Vauxhall Velox of Frank Coad and John Roxburgh. Class wins were achieved by Studebaker, Mercedes-Benz, Peugeot and Renault. In 1962 the class structure changed to one based on price. Jane and Firth switched to a Ford Falcon and once again completed the 500 miles first. Class honours went to Studebaker, Ford, Renault and Volkswagen.

In those days the Phillip Island track was surfaced with a "cold mix" bitumen which could not stand up to the pounding of dozens of race cars going flat out for 500 miles. The track surface broke up and became unsafe during races.

=== Early years in Bathurst ===
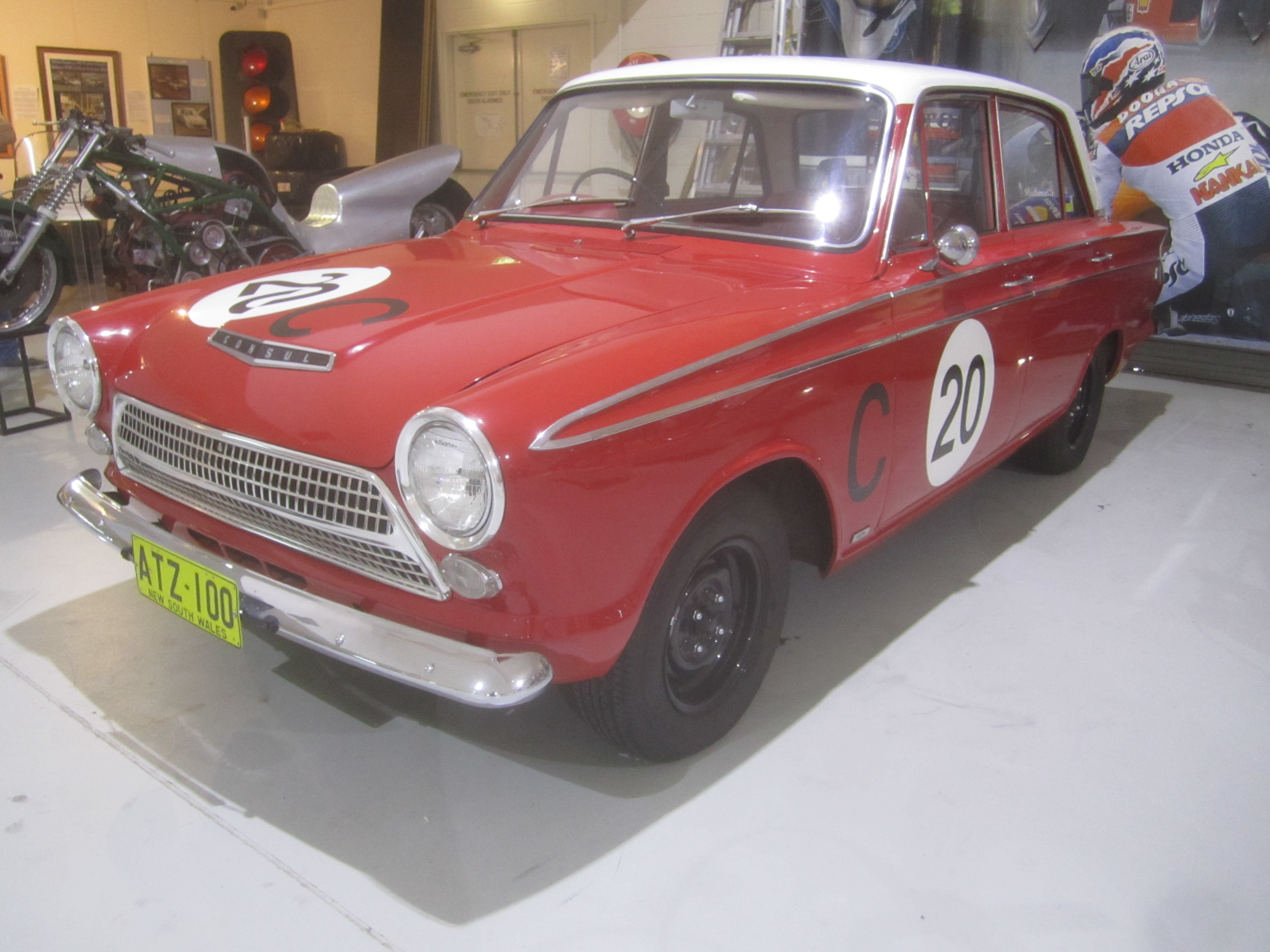
The Ford Cortina GT in which Bob Jane and Harry Firth won the 1963 race.

In 1963 the Armstrong 500 moved to the 6.2-kilometre (3.9 mi) Mount Panorama Circuit at Bathurst in New South Wales. The Bathurst 500 was organised and promoted by a consortium of the Seven Network, the Australian Racing Drivers Club (ARDC), and Bathurst Regional Council; this arrangement continued until 1998. Its popularity grew rapidly, chiefly because it became a means for car manufacturers to showcase their products: the race cars had to be identical to those on the showroom floor. The first years on the Mount Panorama circuit were dominated by swift and agile small cars, such as the Ford Cortina and Mini Cooper. Although the class structure was retained — with many "races within the race" — the emphasis on achieving first outright increased. In 1963, Bob Jane and Harry Firth again triumphed, this time in a Cortina GT. In 1964 the pair drove competing Cortina GTs; Jane won with George Reynolds as co-driver. Barry 'Bo' Seton was second with Herb Taylor. Harry Firth was third with John Reaburn.

The Confederation of Australian Motor Sport introduced new Group E Series Production Touring Car regulations in 1965 but the Armstrong 500 continued with its own regulations.

1965 brought victory for the first overt "Bathurst Special", the Cortina GT 500. Bo Seton and Midge Bosworth completed the 130 laps first. Bruce McPhee and Barry Mulholland were second in an identical car. Third outright and first in Class C were Brian Foley and Peter Manton in a Morris Cooper S. The Geoghegan brothers, Ian and Leo, famously drove the race wearing business suits supplied by McDowells.

In 1966 and 1967 an Irish tobacco company sponsored the race, which became known as the "Gallaher 500". 1966 was the last four-cylinder victory for more than two decades. Rauno Aaltonen and Bob Holden drove their Mini Cooper S to a hard-fought win against stiff competition mainly comprising other Coopers. Mini Coopers filled the first nine places in Class C and outright. Class D was won by a Chrysler VC Valiant V8 that completed 124 laps. Class A was won by the Nissan Factory backed Datsun 1300 of Moto Kitamo and Kunimitsu Takahashi. Class B was taken out by an 1100cc version of the Mini Cooper.

1967 rule changes mandated a minimum number of pit-stops to negate the advantage economical smaller cars had of requiring fewer stops. This change favoured the larger, thirstier Fords and Holdens. The Minis handled the corners well and could, theoretically, run the entire race on a single tank of petrol, but the larger-engined cars were faster in a straight line. Ford's development of the 289 cubic inch V8 Ford Falcon GT signalled the end of small cars as outright contenders. 1967 was also the first year that starting grid positions were allocated according to practice lap times rather than by class groupings. This was also the first year that an official trophy was awarded to the first team to cover the 500 miles.

The 1967 victory of the XR Falcon GT over the smaller Alfa Romeo 1600 GTVs and Mini Coopers surprised many pundits as the Falcon GT was unproven. The highly regarded, and more expensive, Alfa GTV had been seen as the emerging force in touring cars. However, the Falcon GT's V8 power was well suited to the Mount Panorama circuit, particularly on the long straights. Thus was forged the adage that "there is no substitute for cubic inches", which became synonymous with racing at Bathurst. Initially the Geoghegan brothers' Falcon was awarded victory but some hours later Harry Firth and Fred Gibson were declared winners. During the race the Geoghegan car had entered the pit area through the rear access lane off Mountain Straight and erroneously accumulated an extra lap on the ARDC timing board. Third place in Class D fell to the venerable Studebaker Lark of Warren Weldon and John Hall. Class E was won by Doug Chivas and Max Stewart in an Alfa GTV. Classes B and C were won by variants of the Mini, and Class A was won by a Datsun 1000 piloted by John Roxburgh and Doug Whiteford.

The popularity of the race grew rapidly during the 1960s. Most Australian manufacturers and assemblers became heavily involved. A good result in the long and tough race added credibility to the car and its brand, especially in terms of performance, durability and reliability. An outright or class victory was a significant opportunity to increase sales and market share. It was during this period that the famous Holden–Ford–Chrysler rivalry originated. The production-car battle between the "Big Three" was fought at Bathurst. This rivalry spawned Australia's most famous muscle cars, reverentially known as "Bathurst Specials". Ford's Falcon GT and later GT-HO, Holden's Monaro and Torana, and Chrysler's Pacer and Charger models were the result of constant development of race-worthy cars that the general public could buy.

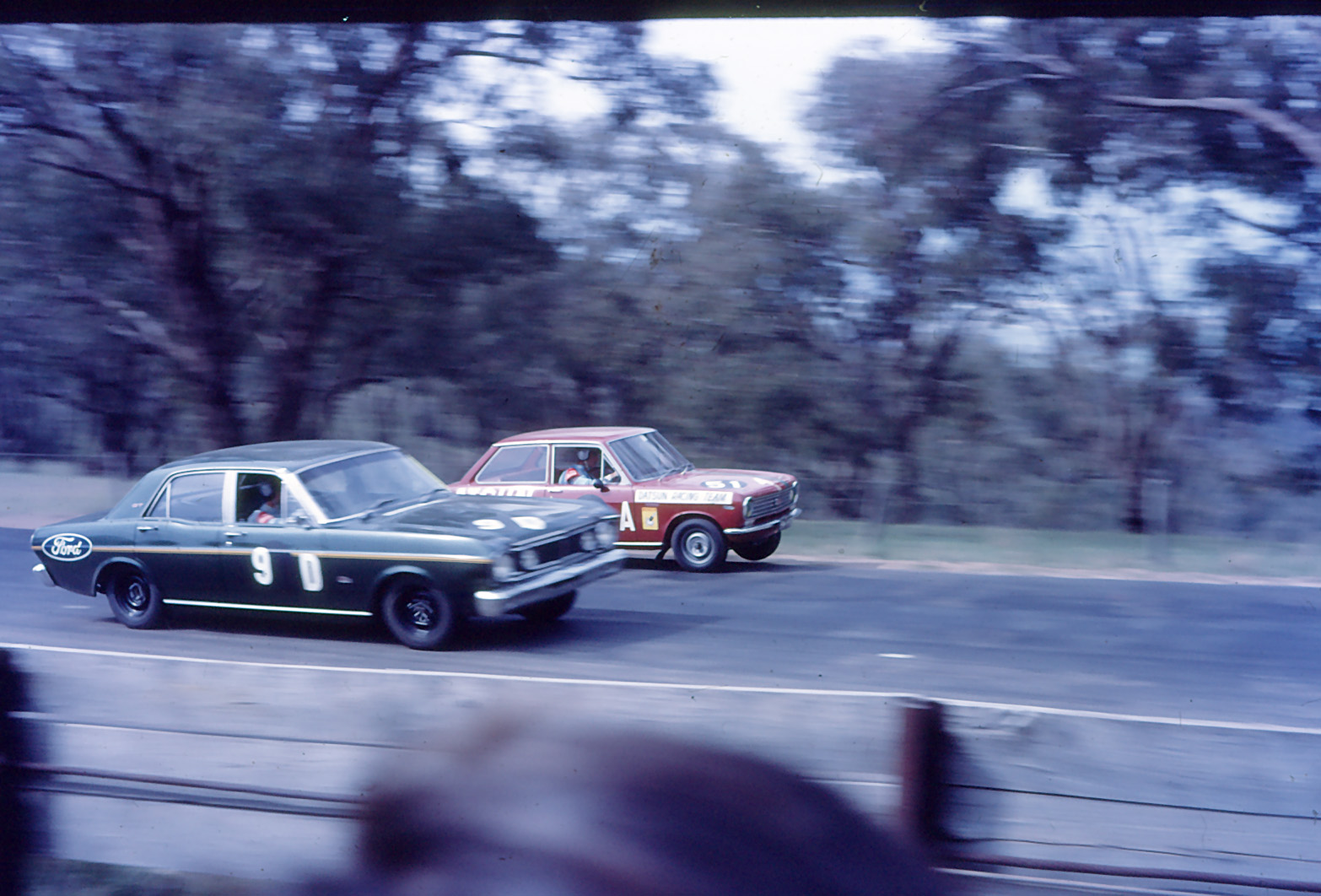
The Ford XT Falcon GT of Barry Seton and Fred Gibson overtakes the Datsun 1000 of Bill Evans and John Colwell during the 1968 race.

In 1968, sponsorship changed again and the race became known as the Hardie-Ferodo 500. It was also the year that advertising was first allowed to be displayed on the cars. In response to Ford's 1967 Bathurst victory, Holden entered the Monaro GTS 327. This was a coupe based on the HK model four-door Kingswood family sedan. Engineered as an affordable personal luxury car with the ability to win Bathurst, it had a 327 cubic inch Chevrolet V8 (as the "GTS 327" name implies). This engine enabled the Monaro GTS 327 to outperform the updated, yet smaller-engined, 302 cubic inch Falcon GTs and win in 1968. This was Holden's first Bathurst 500 win.

The 1969 Hardie-Ferodo 500 saw the first of the Ford Falcon GT-HOs. This Phase One GT-HO Bathurst special Falcon was powered by a 351 cubic inch V8 sourced from Ford America. Its 'HO' specification included upgraded suspension components such as front and rear stabiliser bars. At Bathurst it was fitted with race tyres. Holden upgraded the GTS 327 Monaro to the GTS 350, which included better race-style handling and a more powerful Chevrolet V8 engine of 350 cubic inches. The new GTS 350 Monaro, in the hands of Colin Bond and Tony Roberts, was able to hold out Ford to claim the second victory for Holden. In 1969 there was a multi-car accident on lap one. After the first 10 cars passed through The Esses, contact between two Falcons caused one to roll over. Several cars coming around the blind corner crashed into the stationary car. The track was almost blocked with wreckage but expert flag marshalling enabled the cars to pass through in single file until the debris was cleared. The race was a disaster for Ford as many Falcon tyres failed because of the speed and weight of the Falcons. Ford even a ran a post-race advertising campaign using the slogan "we were a little deflated".

The 1969 race also saw the début of Peter Brock. Brock and Bond were drivers for the semi-official Holden Dealer Team (HDT), which had been formed earlier in the year to counter the official Ford Special Vehicles division that was churning out ever-evolving GT-HO Falcons. The "Old Fox", Harry Firth, who had been in charge of the Ford racing effort until he was abruptly replaced by an American, Al Turner, took charge of the HDT.

1970 saw a change of strategy as Holden chose to race the smaller Torana GTR XU-1 rather than the Monaro. The XU-1 was a special "Bathurst" version of the six-cylinder LC Torana. As the embryonic HQ Holden required too much development to be competitive, Holden created an alternative to the V8 muscle car. The XU-1 was more agile, cheaper and more economical. Triple carburettors on the "Red" motor provided an excellent power-to-weight ratio. The XU-1 was easier on brakes and tyres, thereby minimizing the number of required pit stops. However, Ford refined the GT-HO to Phase Two specification with an even more powerful and better-breathing 351 V8. With tyres that were able to endure the power and torque, the GT-HO reinforced the adage that "there is no substitute for cubic inches". Allan Moffat's GT-HO received the chequered flag followed by Bruce McPhee's identical car. The Torana could not compensate for the power advantage that the Falcons had on the Bathurst straights.

Rule changes for 1970 enabled a single driver to complete the entire race distance. To reduce the chances of another first lap calamity the starting grid was changed from 2-3-2 to a staggered 2-2-2 formation. This meant that the back markers had to start the race from around the corner on Conrod Straight. The race continued to be run to unique regulations which were more restrictive than those which were applied to Series Production racing.

1971 was another Ford victory with Moffat at the wheel. It was won by the ultimate GT-HO, the XY-model Falcon GT-HO Phase Three. This featured upgrades to engine power and aerodynamics, which made it one of the world's fastest four-door mass-produced production cars. Chrysler replaced its Pacers with its new two-door, the Charger. This was powered by a 265 cu in (4.34 L) in-line HEMI six-cylinder engine with triple Weber carburettors. However, by noon on race day, Moffat was far enough in front to pit without losing the lead. Moffat completed the 500 miles first, followed by other GT-HOs in second and third places and filling six of the top seven places. Class wins were achieved by Mazda 1300, Datsun 1600, Mazda RX-2, Torana XU1 and Falcon GT-HO.

1972 saw controversy, following a media-driven "Supercar Scare", which had accumulated enough political momentum to force Holden to postpone introduction of a V8 Torana for two years. Ford abandoned the XA-based Phase Four GT-HO Falcon. Chrysler also followed by not going ahead with a competition version of its V8-powered Charger. Adding to that, the 1972 Hardie-Ferodo 500 was the first Bathurst 500 to be run in wet weather. Allan Moffat was unable to withstand the immense pressure placed on him by Brock in his XU-1. The Torana proved more than a match in the atrocious conditions. After being challenged by Brock's furiously driven XU-1, Moffat was unable to exploit the V8's power advantage and spun early in the race. He also incurred two one-minute penalties for starting the engine while refuelling. Brock, meanwhile, was able to hold off the Phase Three GT-HO of John French and the E49 Charger of Doug Chivas to win the 1972 race, thus temporarily refuting the "no substitute for cubic inches" adage. Brock had pushed the car to its limits in a spectacular display of car control. It was a significant victory for a number of reasons, the first of Brock's nine Bathurst wins which later led to him being nicknamed the "King of the Mountain" and "Peter Perfect". Brock's win also signalled the first Bathurst victory for a six-cylinder engined car, an achievement that would not be repeated until 1991 when the Nissan Skyline GT-R "Godzilla" took the chequered flag. It was also the birth of the Torana legend as this uniquely Australian performance car went on to become one of Australia's most successful touring cars, due in part to numerical supremacy on the track and the withdrawal of Ford and Chrysler from motor racing later in the seventies.

1972 was also the last year that drivers were permitted to drive without co-drivers.

The 1972 race was a round of the 1972 Australian Manufacturers' Championship, which was open to Group E Series Production Touring Cars.

=== Group C Era ===
The race was extended from 500 miles to 1000 kilometres in 1973. The increased pace of the cars had resulted in the 500-mile race distance being achieved earlier each year, and since Australia had converted to the metric system the increased distance was considered more appropriate than 800 km for an endurance race. To reduce the threat to public safety, homologation rules were relaxed to permit certain modifications to the race cars. Ostensibly this removed the need to build batches of high speed road cars and improved the durability of the actual race cars. The Group E Series Production Touring Car regulations, which had applied to the 1972 race, were replaced by the new Group C Touring Car regulations for 1973. Upgrades were allowed to seats, lubrication systems, camshafts, carburettors, suspension, brakes and wheel rim sizes. These changes advantaged the better-resourced teams, as a great deal of testing was now needed to optimize the performance of the race cars. Factory teams had the best access to improved components that were often not readily available to private competitors.

In 1973 Holden campaigned upgraded XU-1s. Privateers entered improved Chargers. Ford unleashed its new XA model "hard top" coupe Ford Falcon GT which had been pioneered by John Goss. While not designated as a GT-HO, race-prepared Hardtop GTs incorporated most of the stillborn Phase Four's components, including the four-bolt 351 V8 engine. The 1973 Hardie-Ferodo 1000 started at 9:30 am. When the flag dropped the "no substitute for cubic inches" ethic prevailed as the Goss Falcon hardtop powered away from pole position. At the end of lap one Fords held the first four places with Toranas fifth, six and seventh. The highest placed Charger was in eighth position. Brock inherited the lead when the Fords started pitting for fuel. Brock and co-driver Chivas had contrived a good lead when a miscalculation caused the Torana to run out of fuel at the top of the Mountain. Intending to perform one less pit stop than the Ford teams, HDT team manager Harry Firth had instructed Chivas to "Get Max Laps" via a hand-held sign. The XU-1 coasted down Conrod Straight and came to a halt just before the entrance to the Pits. Chivas pushed the XU-1 up hill along pit lane. His pit crew could not lend assistance as this would have resulted in disqualification. By the time the XU-1 was refueled, Moffat was well in front. Brock set off in heroic pursuit of Moffat's Falcon GT but the XU-1 suffered a deflating tyre. Moffat claimed another Falcon victory, his third in only four years. Co-driven by Ian (Pete) Geoghegan, the winning Ford was the only Falcon classified as a finisher. 1973 was the last competitive appearance for Chrysler, with the marque disappearing from the Group C category almost entirely. Class wins were achieved by a Datsun 1200, an Alfa GTV, a Mazda RX2 and, of course, the Falcon GT. At the end of the year Ford Australia gave the Falcon GT race cars to their drivers and withdrew from racing.

During the 1974 Australian Touring Car Championship the Torana GTR XU-1 was gradually superseded by the wider bodied SL/R 5000. The Holden Bathurst contingent for this year included 13 SL/R 5000s, 7 XU-1s and one HQ Monaro GTS. Ford was represented in the outright category by three Falcon Hardtop headed by Moffat's Brut 33 XB Falcon Hardtop GT. He was supported by John Goss and Kevin Bartlett in an XA Hardtop and Murray Carter in another XB Falcon Hardtop. The V8 Toranas ran away at the start of the 1974 race and Holden victory seemed assured. By lap 11 Brock had already lapped 7 of the outright Class D cars. On lap 12 Moffat pitted and lost several laps as a new coil was fitted. By lap 20 the HDT Toranas of Brock and Bond were over a minute in front of Goss in the only competitive Falcon. By lap 85 the two HDT Toranas were four laps clear of the field. Around the 90 lap mark rain started to fall at the top of the mountain. The HDT Toranas soon pitted for wet weather tyres after which the Bond Torana started smoking from an oil leak. The car was eventually black flagged. While the mechanics were trying to fix the problem Brock pitted with a broken piston caused by a failed oil pump. Bond returned to the track but lost more time with a spin. Despite determined driving from Jim Richards and Wayne Negus, the Goss/Bartlett car was able to gain a slight lead as the Torana challenge faded amidst oil smoke and torrential rain. Bartlett completed the 163 laps in first place. The only other car on the same lap was the Forbes/Negus SL/R 5000. The smaller classes were won by a Morris Cooper S, an Alfa GTV and a Mazda RX-3. Car number 34, a lone Morris Marina, finished 6th in Class C having completed 125 laps.

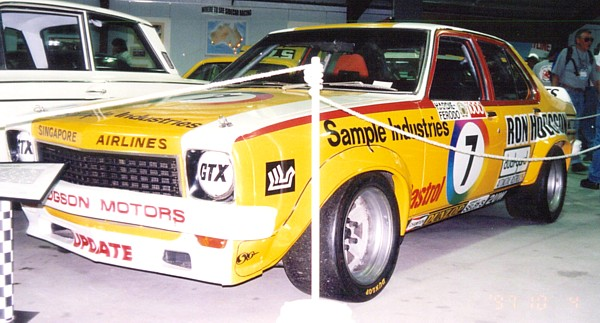
The Holden LH Torana SL/R 5000 L34 in which Bob Morris and John Fitzpatrick won the 1976 race.

Holden's 308 cubic inch V8-powered Toranas scored Bathurst victories in 1975, 1976, 1978 and 1979 in L34 and A9X configuration. Ford's 351 XC Falcon famously finished first and second in 1977. On the final lap, the two Moffat Ford Dealers entries of Allan Moffat and Colin Bond ran in formation down Conrod Straight, with the helicopter footage of the formation becoming one of the most famous images in Bathurst 1000 history. This was Moffat's last Bathurst 1000 victory. Group C carried over into the 1980s. Holden and Ford were the only manufacturers to win under these regulations, despite facing increased imported competition, notably from the Mazda RX-7 that was campaigned effectively by Moffat and Kevin Bartlett's 350 V8-powered Chevrolet Camaro. The turbo-powered Nissan Bluebird piloted by George Fury also threatened the V8 'Big Bangers' and signalled a sign of things to come during the Group A era. Peter Brock cemented his reputation as the driver to beat during this period, including achieving two Bathurst hat-tricks with the Marlboro-sponsored HDT. In 1978 and 1979 he and Jim Richards drove an A9X Torana to victory, while in 1980 the pair won in a VC Commodore. His second hat trick consisted of victories in 1982, 1983 and 1984, this time partnering with Larry Perkins in a VH Commodore for the first two years and in a VK Commodore in the third. In 1983, John Harvey also shared the win with Brock and Perkins. Dick Johnson was the only winner for Ford during the 1980s under Group C, with a victory in 1981 whilst at the wheel of the XD Falcon. It was a famous win, coming twelve months after writing his car off in an incident with a rock in 1980. It also followed a large public fundraising campaign to provide him with the finances to build a new car, which eventually raised AU$144,000, half of which came from Ford Australia itself. Group C was replaced by the International Group A Touring car rules in 1985, with selected cars preparing for this change and competing in a separate "Group A" class in 1984.

=== Group A Era ===
From 1985 to 1992, the Bathurst 1000 was run to international Group A regulations. Imported turbocharged cars, initially Ford Sierra RS Cosworths and then Nissan Skyline GT-Rs, achieved dominance during this period while Holden Commodores managed to claim three hard-fought wins. The JPS Team BMW run 635 CSis and M3s were also highly competitive during this era. Group A enabled Australian teams to develop cars that could be raced overseas. Locally built cars were driven in Europe by Allan Grice, Peter Brock, John Harvey, Allan Moffat, Dick Johnson and John Bowe. Tom Walkinshaw also briefly campaigned VL Commodores in Europe.

Holden-based race teams continued development of the 308 cubic inch V8-powered Commodore. The HDT and the later Holden Racing Team (HRT) were at the forefront of Commodore development. With almost no support from Ford Australia, Group A Ford Falcons never eventuated. Dick Johnson Racing switched to a 1983 Zakspeed-developed Ford Mustang GT formerly raced in Europe by German ace Klaus Ludwig. Johnson and co-driver Larry Perkins were very competitive in the agile Mustang but it lacked top-end power. Ford teams went on to adopt the more powerful, though less reliable, Ford Sierra Turbo Cosworth. These were available race-ready from Europe and were campaigned by many teams including Allan Moffat Racing, Dick Johnson Racing and eventually a team run by Holden stalwart Peter Brock.

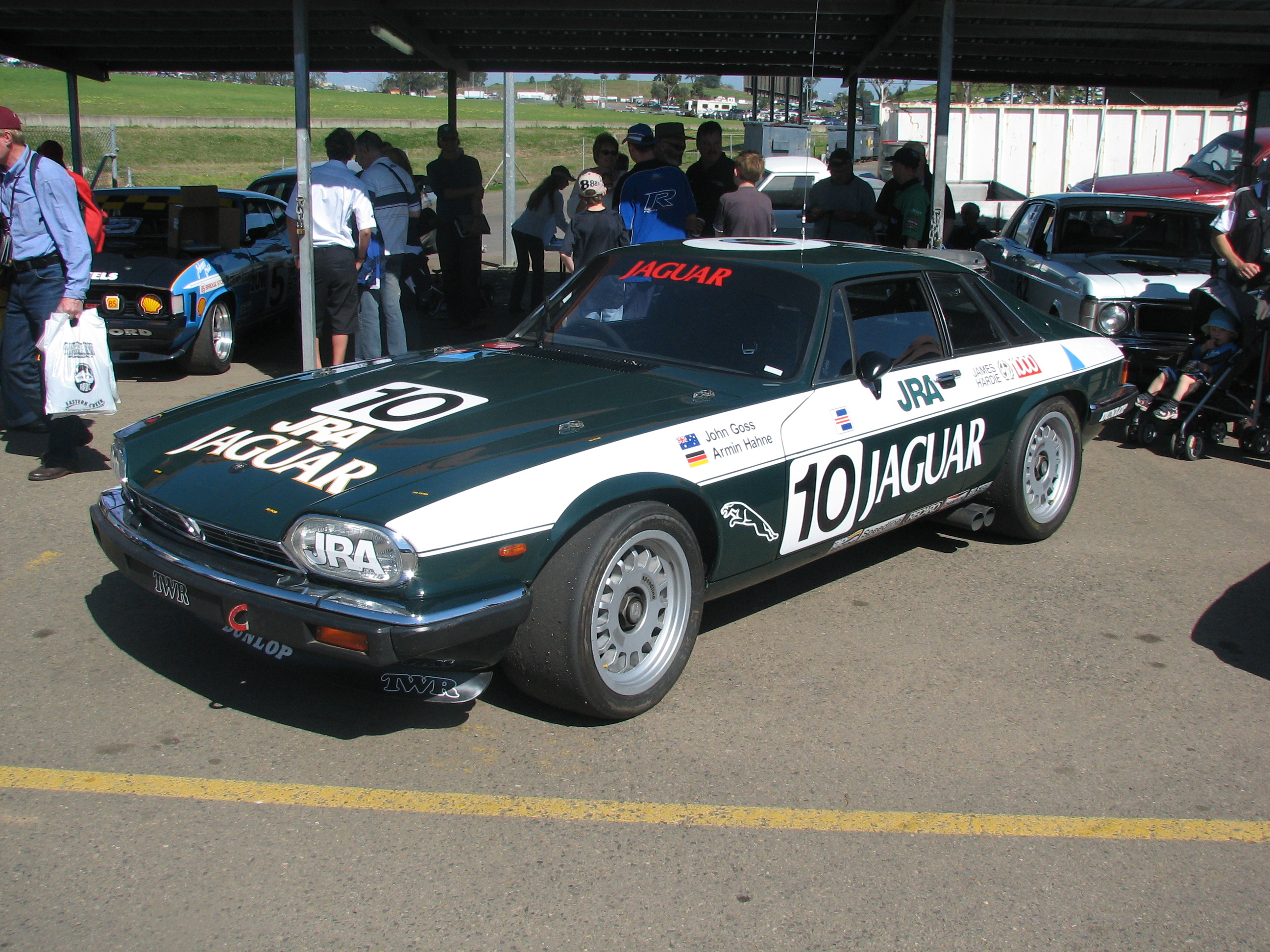
A replica of the Jaguar XJ-S in which John Goss and Armin Hahne won the 1985 race.

1985 was the first year that the Bathurst 1000 was run under Group A rules. The race was dominated by Tom Walkinshaw Racing's three-car Jaguar XJ-S team, the big V12-powered Jaguars having a clear power and speed advantage over the still-developing Australian Group A teams and cars. 1974 winner John Goss and West German driver Armin Hahne claimed Jaguar's only Bathurst 1000 win. The following year, 1986, the Holden VK Commodore SS Group A of privateer racer Allan Grice and Graeme Bailey took the honours. Grice had honed his skills in Europe, competing alongside compatriot Commodore driver Peter Brock and his newly recruited HDT teammate, Allan Moffat.

1986 saw the race's first fatality. Sydney driver Mike Burgmann died when his VK Commodore hit the concrete base of the bridge over Conrod Straight at 260 km/h (160 mph). Consequent to Burgmann's death the circuit was altered prior to the 1987 race by the incorporation of "The Chase" two-thirds of the way down Conrod Straight. This complex added 41 metres to the length of the track and was designed to reduce the approach speed to Murray's Corner by approximately 100 km/h (62 mph). As a result of "The Chase", lap times around the circuit increased by approximately 4–5 seconds (based on times in comparable cars from the 1986 and 1987 races).

In 1987, the Bathurst 1000 became a round of the shortlived World Touring Car Championship, resulting in European teams racing against local Australian teams in the 1000. The resulting culture clash caused considerable angst between officials and team management. Since the start of Group A in Australia, CAMS local scrutineers diligently applied the Group A regulations as written. The global organising body FISA, a subsidiary of the Fédération Internationale de l'Automobile (FIA), allowed more liberal, negotiated interpretations "back home". Some European teams, most prominently the Ford Europe–backed Eggenberger Motorsport, ran questionable vehicles. With the race complete, it was still unclear as to who was the legitimate winner. Eggenberger's cars finished first and second on the road but were disqualified months later due to bodywork irregularities. The race win was therefore awarded to third-placed Peter Brock, who drove two of his Holden VL Commodore SS Group A cars during the race. Brock broke his '05' HDT Commodore early in the event so he and co-driver David Parsons took over the team's second car, the #10 Commodore of Peter McLeod, to cross the line third behind the two Sierras. It was to be Brock's ninth and final Bathurst 1000 win.

Local Sierra teams dominated and won the next two Bathurst 1000s. 1988 saw Tony Longhurst and Tomas Mezera win in their Frank Gardner–prepared RS500. In the 1989 race, Peter Brock claimed his record-setting 6th pole at Bathurst, his first in anything but a Holden. Dick Johnson and John Bowe won a hard-fought race ahead of Allan Moffat Racing's all-German combination of Klaus Niedzwiedz and Frank Biela.

In 1990 the Sierras again proved strong, but the HRT Commodore of Allan Grice and Win Percy prevailed. Their Holden VL Commodore SS Group A SV was able to set a fast pace early in the race which the Sierras could match but not sustain due to reliability issues, mostly with tyre wear. The HRT claimed a popular Bathurst victory for Holden after three seasons of Sierra domination.

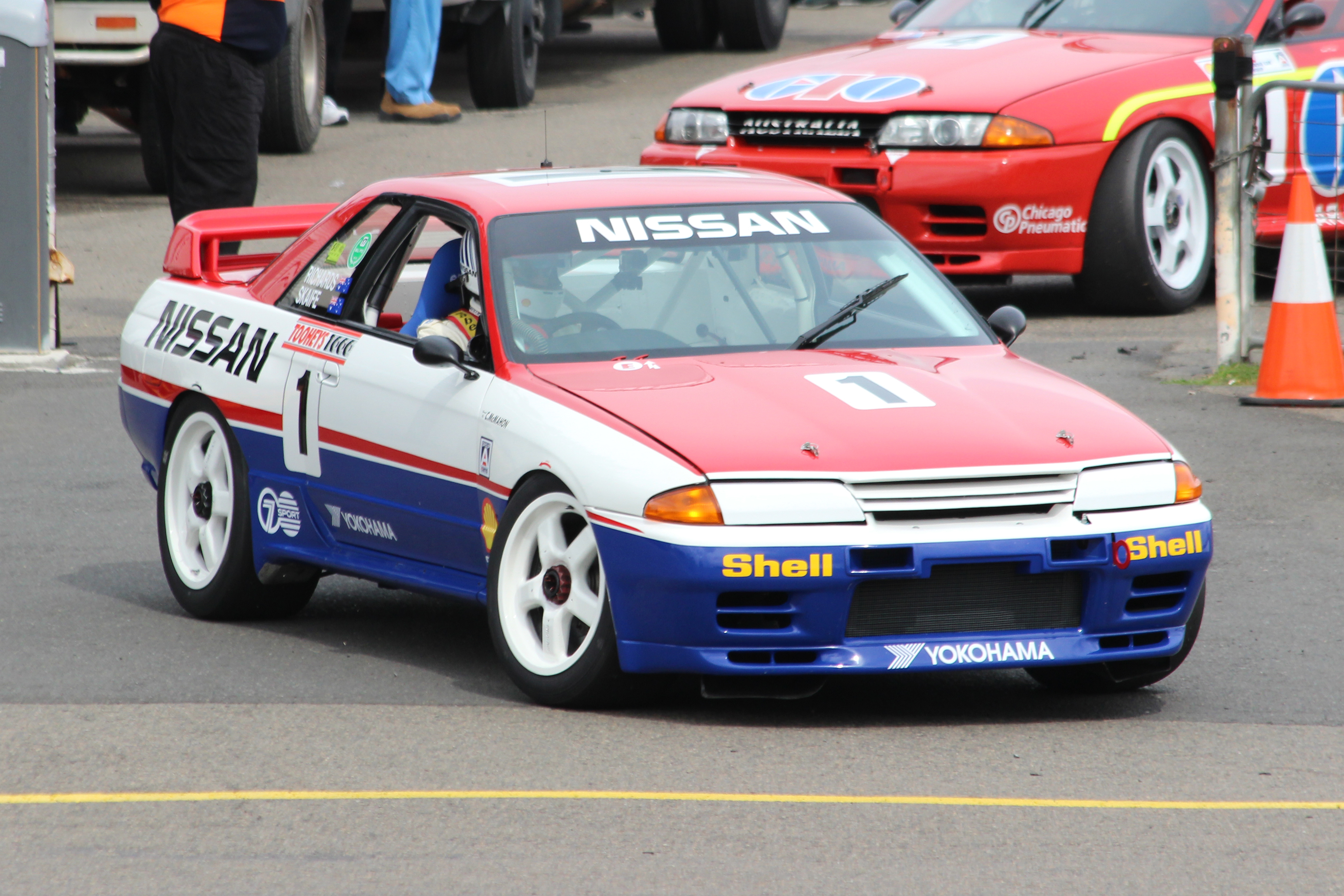
The Nissan Skyline GT-R in which Jim Richards and Mark Skaife won the 1991 race.

A fierce new opponent was waiting in the wings. Nissan and team manager Fred Gibson had campaigned Skylines in Australian competition for a few years. For the 1990 race, they debuted the R32 four-wheel drive, four wheel steer, twin turbo Nissan Skyline GT-R. Though initially suffering from problems related to complexity and reliability, the GT-R went on to dominate Group A racing worldwide. Gibson's lead drivers, Jim Richards and Mark Skaife, easily won the 1991 Bathurst 1000; Skaife had set a sensational time of 2:12.63 in the Top 10 Runoff for pole, 2/10th faster than George Fury's Group C 1984 pole time on the shorter pre-Chase circuit. Richards and Skaife repeated the win in controversial circumstances in 1992. The car gained the nickname 'Godzilla'. With four-wheel drive, four-wheel steer, and a powerful turbo 2.6-litre six-cylinder engine producing around 640 bhp (477 kW; 649 PS), the Skyline's superior handling and power output was unmatched by the rear-wheel-drive Sierras and Commodores. In an attempt to achieve parity between the makes, weight penalties (140 kg) and turbo-restricting pop-off valves were applied to the Nissan. With the pop-off valves in place, the Nissans were reported to now be only producing around 450 bhp (336 kW; 456 PS), though team boss Fred Gibson would (in later years) confess that the Winfield-sponsored cars were actually producing around 600 bhp (447 kW; 608 PS) after his team had managed to fool CAMS officials during the year.

The Skyline's 1992 victory was particularly controversial. The parochial Bathurst crowd, and touring-car fans in general, had been conditioned to view the Bathurst 1000 as a perpetual struggle between Holden and Ford. Although the Group A racing Commodores and Sierras were far removed from road-going examples, the Nissans were seen as being unfairly advantaged and received considerable negative comment in the build-up to the race. Late in the 1992 race, severe rainstorms swept the track, causing several accidents as dry-weather tyres caused extreme aquaplaning. During the ensuing mayhem the leading Skyline of Jim Richards and Mark Skaife slid into two wrecked cars. Simultaneously officials red-flagged the race due to the perilous condition of the wet track. The surviving cars were marshalled in single file on Pit Straight. Regulations decreed that, as the leaders had completed more than 75% of race distance, the race was not to be restarted.

Under these regulations, red-flag race results were based on positions held at the end of the last completed lap as there was no official record of the lap not completed. As Richards had been leading the race on that lap, his team was declared the winner. This was an unpopular decision with some race fans, many of whom could not understand how a wrecked Nissan could beat a perfectly healthy Sierra that had passed it on the track. As the rain clouds dissipated many unhappy campers loudly voiced their opinions. Race winners Mark Skaife and Jim Richards were challenged by a rowdy, confused and alcohol-fuelled crowd. On the winners' podium the normally affable Richards responded to the boos of the crowd with, "this is bloody disgraceful" and "you're a pack of arseholes" during the nationally televised trophy presentation.

=== Group 3A and Super Touring ===
Group A as an international formula faded away in the late 1980s. The Confederation of Australian Motor Sport (CAMS) had planned to replace Group A at the end of 1991. This was postponed to the end of 1992 owing to the inability of FISA to specify a new International formula. As any new regulations were unlikely to suit large-engined cars, CAMS created a uniquely Australian touring car formula for 1993, Group 3A. This iteration evolved into the Supercars category. Entry became limited to V8-powered Ford Falcons and Holden Commodores (with, in 1993 only, the exception of weight-limited normally aspirated Group A cars like the BMW M3s of LoGaMo Racing).

The new regulations created a separate class for 2-litre cars, based on the British Touring Car Championship's (BTCC) regulations of the time. This class excluded turbochargers and four wheel drive, effectively ending the Nissan's GT-R's eligibility. In response Nissan withdrew from Australian motorsport. The two classes of touring cars competed in the same races for two championships in 1993. The 1993 Tooheys 1000 was won by Larry Perkins and Gregg Hansford after a race-long duel with the Mark Skaife/Jim Richards Commodore VP. The winner of the 2-litre class was the John Cotter/Peter Doulman BMW M3 which had reverted to 2 litres capacity.

In the 1994 season, the 2-litre Super Touring championship was run separately from the ATCC, though both categories ran as two classes at Bathurst. The 1994 Tooheys 1000 was won by the EB Falcon of Dick Johnson and John Bowe. The top-placed 2-litre car was the works BMW of Paul Morris and Altfrid Heger which finished 10th outright, six laps behind Johnson and Bowe. In 1995, owing to fears about the growing speed difference between the V8s and the 2-litre cars, the Bathurst 1000 became a one-class race for the first time. Just 32 Ford and Holden V8s faced the starter in what was, at the time, the smallest grid in the history of the race. The 1995 champions were Larry Perkins and Russell Ingall in a Holden VR Commodore, followed by Alan Jones and Allan Grice in an EF Falcon. 1996 saw Craig Lowndes and Greg Murphy, in a VR Commodore, cross the finish line ahead of the EF Falcon of Dick Johnson and John Bowe. Tony Longhurst and Steven Ellery were third in another EF Falcon.

=== A race divided ===
In 1996, the Touring Car Entrants Group of Australia (TEGA) (who had held the rights to market the ATCC since 1994) signed a deal with US sports agent Mark McCormack's International Management Group (IMG) to market the ATCC, which they renamed to V8 Supercars. The new joint venture company (AVESCO) signed a TV deal for 1997 with Network Ten, which included expanded coverage of the championship. This was not an issue for the ATCC races, but for the Bathurst 1000, which was organized and promoted by a consortium that included Channel 7, it was a major issue. Channel 7 had televised the race since 1963 and had a contract that was binding into the 21st century. Seven was not prepared to drop the race, while AVESCO required a Bathurst race for Ten to broadcast. A similar dispute affected the V8 Supercars Challenge support races at the Australian Grand Prix; at various times different networks held the V8 Supercars and Formula One broadcast rights.

There was no resolution to the dispute, and AVESCO announced that V8 Supercars would not compete in the traditional Bathurst 1000 held on the October long weekend in 1997. TOCA Australia was invited to fill the void with a 2-litre Super Touring field, featuring a number of British Touring Car Championship drivers and teams, including Alain Menu, John Cleland and Rickard Rydell, joining Australian Super Touring Championship regulars. This 1997 race was won by Paul Morris and Craig Baird in a BMW 320i, but they were later disqualified as Baird had exceeded the mandated time limit for a continuous solo driving period. The race was awarded to their BMW Motorsport Australia teammates David and Geoff Brabham. This event format continued for 1998 with the addition of a field of cars from the New Zealand Touring Car Championship, which ran to Schedule S regulations with a 2.5-litre engine limit, as well as Group E production cars. Alongside Rickard Rydell, Jim Richards won his sixth Bathurst 1000 in a Volvo S40 run by Tom Walkinshaw Racing, with his son Steven second in a Nissan Primera run by British team Team Dynamics.

As well as these races for two-litre cars, separate five-litre (V8 Supercars) races were held in 1997 and 1998, known as the "Australian 1000 Classic". Having received backlash after announcing they would not race at Bathurst, AVESCO hastily made a deal with the Bathurst Regional Council for the use of the circuit. The 1997 Primus 1000 Classic, as it was known, was held two weeks after the traditional race, while the 1998 FAI 1000 was held in mid-November. The 1997 race saw Larry Perkins and Russell Ingall repeat their 1995 triumph, ahead of the father and son combination of Jim and Steven Richards. In 1998, Steven Richards did one better, winning the race with Jason Bright for Stone Brothers Racing. Their Ford EL Falcon was badly damaged in a practice crash and required lengthy repairs before the race.

Both the Super Touring and V8 Supercar races claimed to be the legitimate Bathurst 1000. The V8 Supercars' case was that they were the truly Australian class of racing and, through contractual binding, had the "star" Australian drivers. The Super Touring claim to legitimacy was based on it being held on the traditional date by the ARDC who had run the event every year since 1963. Each of the four races in 1997 and 1998 are considered as legitimate Bathurst 1000s in the record books.

=== V8 Supercars era ===
For 1999, the Super Touring event devolved into a 300-kilometre race for mixed Auscar and Future Tourer V8s, which was won by Peter Brock's step-son James Brock, and a 500-kilometre race for Super Touring won by Paul Morris. This would be the last major Super Touring race at Bathurst, the last organised by the ARDC and the last held on the traditional Labour Day holiday weekend. The demise of Super Touring and the ARDC event allowed V8 Supercars and IMG to take over the promotion and organisation of the Bathurst 1000 brand from that year onwards. From 1999 onwards, the race also counted for championship points for the first time, taking a position as the final round on the calendar.

In 2000, the 1000-kilometre race remained in November because the Sydney Olympics blocked out sport in October. When the long weekend again became available in 2001, the National Rugby League shifted its Grand Final to that Sunday, denying the Bathurst 1000 a return to its traditional weekend. The race moved to the weekend following the long weekend from 2001 onwards, and to an earlier spot in the championship calendar. The start of this new era was dominated by Holden, which won every Bathurst 1000 from 1999 to 2005. In 1999, Steven Richards repeated his 1998 triumph, winning with Greg Murphy in their Gibson Motorsport Holden VT Commodore. Richards became the first driver to win consecutively in a Ford and a Holden. This was also the first win for Gibson Motorsport since their wins with Nissan in 1991 and 1992. Garth Tander and Jason Bargwanna became Bathurst champions in 2000 with Garry Rogers Motorsport.

In 2001, Mark Skaife, driving for the Holden Racing Team, teamed with 1988 winner Tony Longhurst to win the Bathurst 1000 in a Holden VX Commodore. Despite late cooling problems from plastic bags in the air intake, Skaife and HRT again won the Bathurst 1000 in 2002, this time teamed with Jim Richards. Ten years after being heckled off the podium after winning in 1992, this time Richards jokingly said that the crowd was "a lovely bunch of people". Greg Murphy received the biggest time penalty (five minutes) in Bathurst history because of a pit-lane infringement; his car was released prematurely, rupturing a refuelling hose and spilling fuel in the pit box.

In the Top 10 Shootout in 2003, Greg Murphy drove what became known as the "Lap of the Gods" for a record-setting Mount Panorama Circuit time of 2:06.8594. Murphy went on to win the Bathurst 1000 with Rick Kelly in 2003 and 2004 for K-Mart Racing. Rick Kelly became the race's youngest winner in 2003 at the age of 20. Rick's brother Todd Kelly won the 2005 race on his birthday with Mark Skaife for HRT.

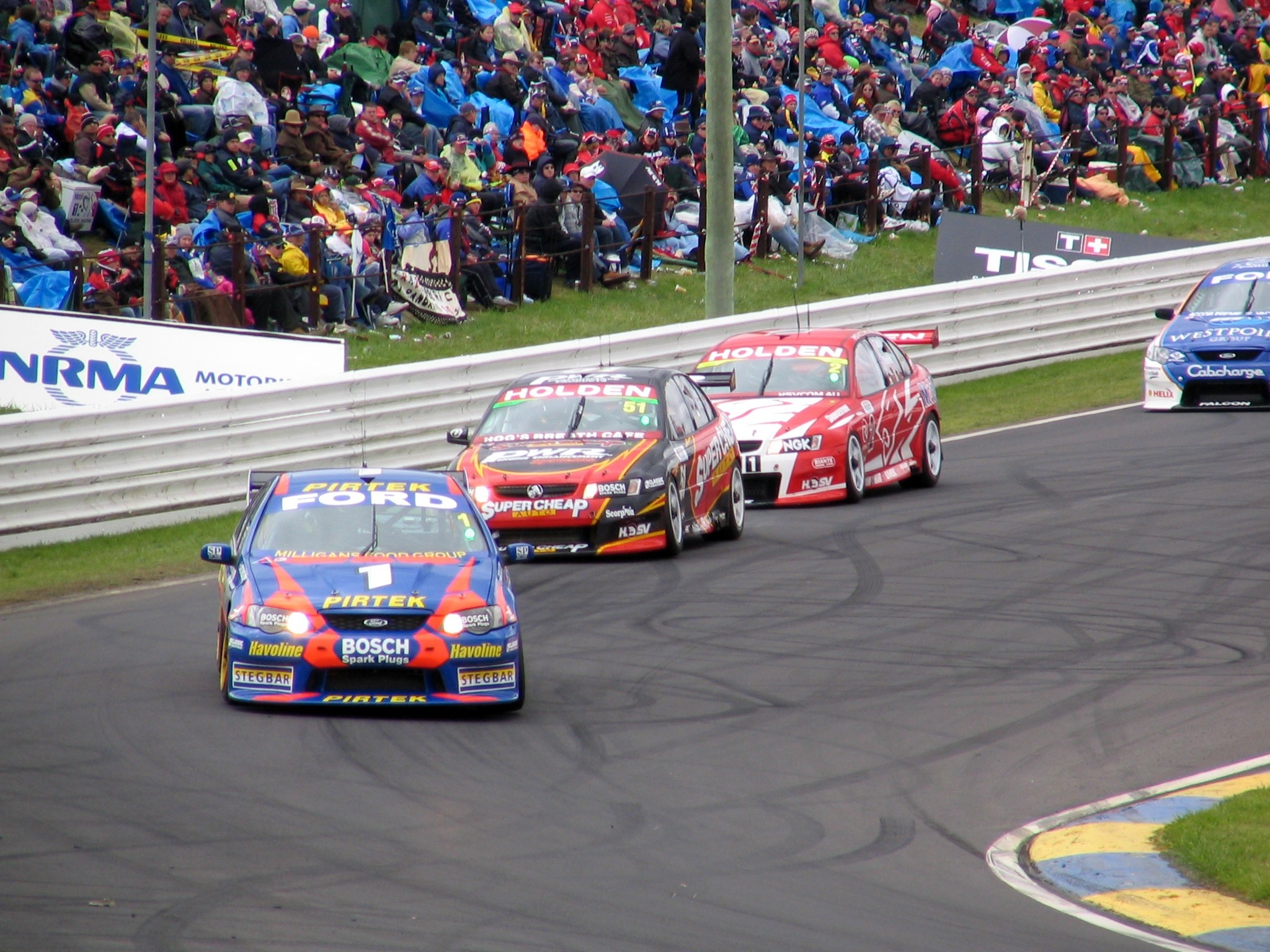
The Ford BA Falcon of Marcos Ambrose and Warren Luff leads a train of cars during the 2005 race.

In 2006, Craig Lowndes and Jamie Whincup won the first race for Ford in eight years, driving for Triple Eight Race Engineering. They were also the first winners of the Peter Brock Trophy (following the passing of Peter Brock the previous month). Lowndes and Whincup then won the next two races to achieve the first three-peat since Brock and Larry Perkins won the Bathurst 1000 from 1982 to 1984 (the 1983 win was also shared with John Harvey). Holden achieved four straight wins from 2009 to 2012. The 2009 race was won by the HRT's Garth Tander and Will Davison. 2009 was the first Bathurst 1000 using the E85 fuel blend; increased fuel consumption resulted in more pit stops. 2010 saw another win for Lowndes and Triple Eight, this time with Mark Skaife, their fifth and sixth wins respectively. In 2011, Nick Percat partnered with Garth Tander to become the first rookie to win the Bathurst 1000 since Jacky Ickx in 1977, with Tander barely holding off Lowndes in a close finish.

Ahead of new regulations for 2013, the Triple Eight Holden VE Commodore of Jamie Whincup and Paul Dumbrell won in 2012 just 0.31 seconds ahead of David Reynolds and Dean Canto. The closest non-formation finish was set just the year before when Tander and Percat lifted the trophy 0.29 seconds ahead of Lowndes and Skaife.

The 2013 season saw manufacturers other than Ford and Holden enter the Bathurst 1000 for the first time since 1998, under the New Generation V8 Supercar (originally known as Car of the Future) regulations that were introduced that year. Nissan returned with four Nissan Altimas run by Kelly Racing. Mercedes-Benz returned through Australian GT Championship team Erebus Motorsport with its three Mercedes-Benz E63 AMGs. From 2013, the event became part of the newly formed Pirtek Enduro Cup within the Supercars season, along with the series' other two-driver races, the Sandown 500 and Gold Coast 600. The 2013 race itself was a close finish between Ford's factory team drivers from Ford Performance Racing, Mark Winterbottom and Steven Richards, and Triple Eight Race Engineering's Jamie Whincup and Paul Dumbrell. In 2013 the 1000 km was completed in the record time of six hours, eleven minutes and twenty-seven seconds. This was Ford's first victory since 2008. It was also the first time since 1977 that an overtly Ford factory backed car triumphed.

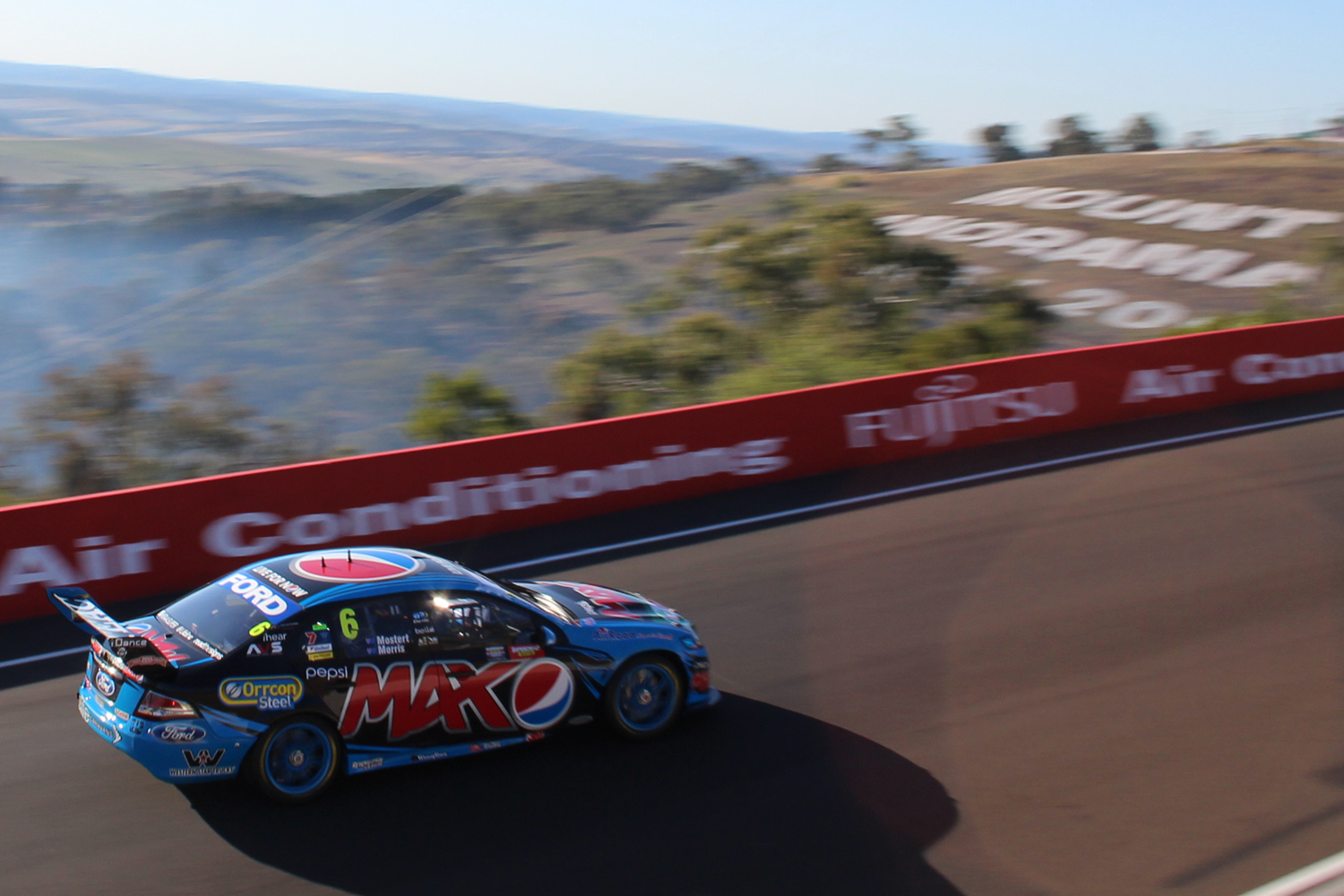
The Ford FG Falcon in which Chaz Mostert and Paul Morris won the 2014 race.

The 2014 Supercheap Auto Bathurst 1000 saw Volvo return for the first time since 1998, with Garry Rogers Motorsport entering two Volvo S60s. Between the 2013 and 2014 races, the track was resurfaced. This new track surface resulted in a marked reduction of lap times, and during free practice many of the drivers recorded times that were under the existing practice lap record. As with the early Phillip Island races, some of this new surface started to break up early in the race, particularly at Griffin's Bend. Many drivers were caught off guard and ran into the tyre wall due to the debris on the track.

With 100 laps remaining, the officials suspended the race with a red flag, only the third red flag at the race after 1981 and 1992. The cars were then lined up on pit straight, and controversy ensued as teams exploited the regulations and performed repairs on the cars. Once the track repairs were finished the race resumed in single file under the safety car. Racing soon recommenced, but competition was further interrupted by a number of safety-car periods. The race was run to its full distance and finished in the early evening, with Ford Performance Racing drivers Chaz Mostert and Paul Morris taking victory on the final lap, after the lead car of Jamie Whincup and Paul Dumbrell ran low on fuel. Morris and Mostert had started the race from last position after being excluded from qualifying.

In 2015, Chaz Mostert experienced a major reversal of fortunes, with a heavy qualifying crash leaving him with a fractured femur and wrist, and ruling his car out for the weekend. The incident also injured several marshals. On Sunday, after a mid-race rain shower, Craig Lowndes and Steven Richards eventually prevailed for their sixth and fourth wins of the Bathurst 1000 respectively. It was Lowndes' thirteenth podium at the event, an all-time record.

=== Supercars Championship era ===
The 2016 race, the first under the renamed Supercars Championship banner, featured 91 green laps to start the race, followed by a dramatic and safety-car–filled conclusion to proceedings. Most notably, there was a late-race incident between Garth Tander and Scott McLaughlin, retiring the former's car, which occurred as Triple Eight's Jamie Whincup attempted to redress a clash between himself and McLaughlin at the Chase. Whincup received a fifteen-second time penalty; despite taking the chequered flag first, he was classified 11th. This allowed the Tekno Autosports entry of Will Davison and Jonathon Webb to take victory, just over one tenth of a second ahead of the Triple Eight entry of Shane van Gisbergen and Alexandre Prémat. Following the finish, Triple Eight announced they were appealing the penalty, regarding the appropriateness of a time penalty for such an offence. The appeal, held by the Supercars National Court of Appeal in the County Court of Victoria, was dismissed in a hearing nine days after the race.

The 2017 Supercheap Auto Bathurst 1000 saw another victory for an independent team with Erebus Motorsport prevailing in mostly wet conditions with David Reynolds and Luke Youlden behind the wheel. Erebus also joined Tekno as the only teams to win both the Bathurst 12 Hour and the Bathurst 1000. David Reynolds and Luke Youlden continued their form into the 2018 edition, taking pole and leading the majority of the race until Reynolds suffered from leg cramps late in the race, allowing the 2015-winning combination of Craig Lowndes and Steven Richards to take the lead and the eventual victory, Lowndes' seventh event win and Richards' fifth.

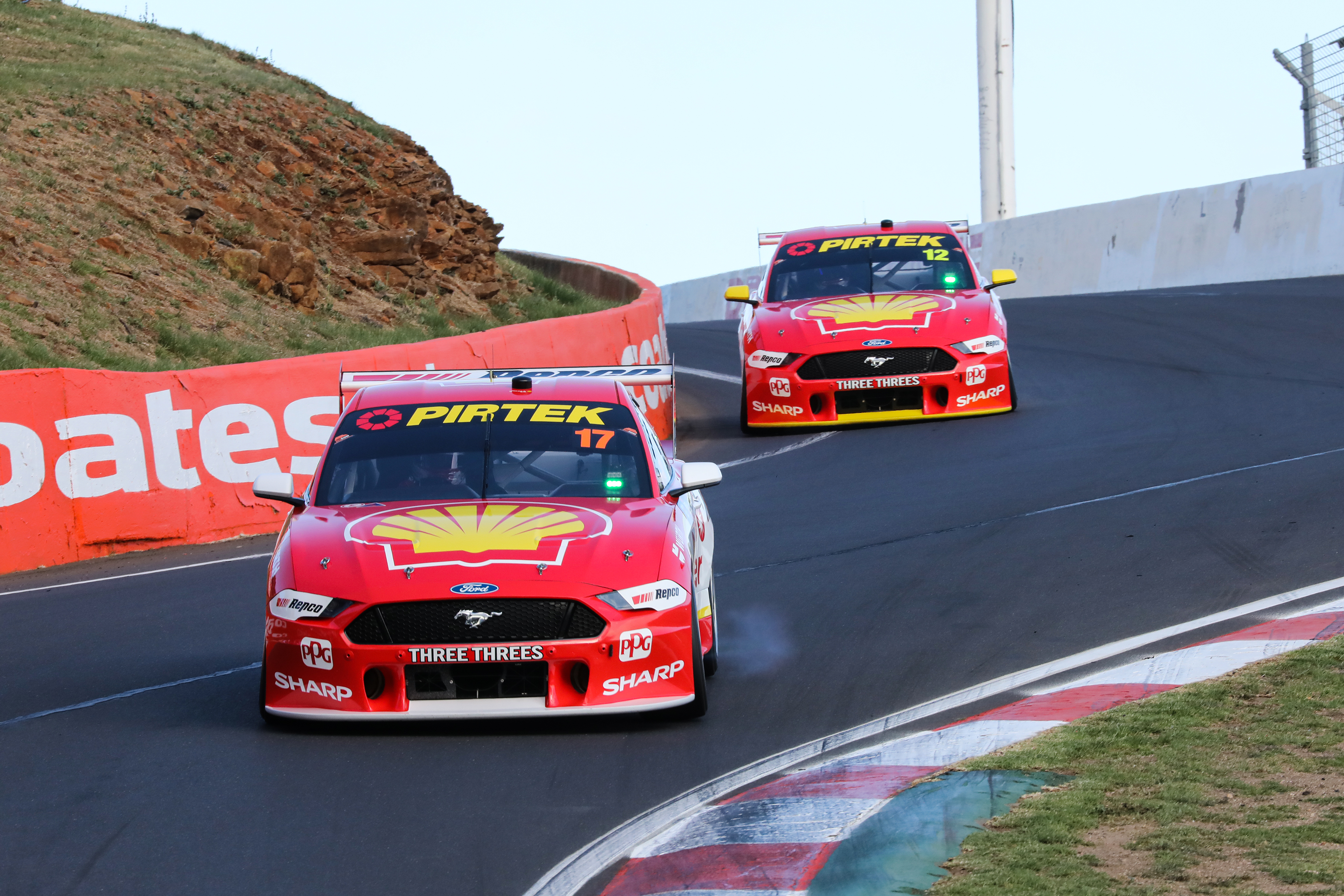
Scott McLaughlin and Alexandre Prémat (foreground) won the 2019 Bathurst 1000 while team-mates Fabian Coulthard and Tony D'Alberto (background) were relegated to last place after a rules breach.

The 2019 race only featured one safety car in the first 101 laps, but the final 60 laps featured seven, eventually resulting in a one-lap sprint to the chequered flag. Scott McLaughlin, driving with Alexandre Prémat, held on to win from the Triple Eight entry of Shane van Gisbergen and Garth Tander; this was the first Bathurst 1000 win for the Ford Mustang nameplate, the first for Dick Johnson Racing since Team Penske took a stake in the team in 2014, and the first for DJR since 1994. However, the race results remained provisional for a week until a hearing was held into DJR Team Penske's instructions to team-mate Fabian Coulthard during an earlier safety car. The instructions over team radio resulted in Coulthard slowing the field after a safety car was called, which allowed McLaughlin and Jamie Whincup to pit without losing any positions. Despite already being given a drive-through penalty during the race, after the hearing Coulthard was further relegated to the last finisher and the team was docked 300 Teams' Championship points and fined AU$250,000 with $100,000 of the fine suspended. As it could not be proven that the instructions were intended to advantage McLaughlin and Prémat, their race win remained. One month after the race, an investigation into McLaughlin's qualifying engine found a breach, resulting in a further fine, loss of his pole position and qualifying lap record and demotion to last place on the grid for the 2019 Sandown 500.

Because of the COVID-19 pandemic, the 2020 race was held a week later than usual and with a limited number of fans, capped at 4,000 daily. In what was the final event for a factory-backed Holden team before the brand's retirement, the race was won by Shane van Gisbergen and Garth Tander, the latter's fourth Bathurst 1000 win. For the first time since 2000, the event was the final round of the championship, but Scott McLaughlin had already secured an unassailable lead at the penultimate event.

== Famous winners ==
The most successful driver at Bathurst is Peter Brock, whose nine victories (1972, 1975, 1978–80, 1982–84 and 1987) earned him the nickname King of the Mountain. For this reason, rock band Midnight Oil would also play their song, "King of the Mountain" or the TV station broadcasting the race would play the song.

Bob Jane won the race four times in succession from 1961 to 1964. Jane's racing exploits assisted in the creation of his automotive businesses, originally with automotive vehicle dealerships, then later more prominently with a national chain of tyre retailers, Bob Jane T-Marts. The company became a title sponsor of the race between 2002 and 2004. Three of Jane's wins were with Harry Firth, who went on to win a fourth race in 1967 and also was a team manager for the 1969 and 1972 Holden Dealer Team victories.

New Zealand's Jim Richards won the race seven times (1978–80, 1991–92, 1998 and 2002) and also holds the record for the most starts (35) at this event. Richards' son Steven is also a five-time winner (1998, 1999, 2013, 2015 and 2018). The two other multiple winners from New Zealand are Greg Murphy, who has won the race four times (1996, 1999, 2003 and 2004), and Shane van Gisbergen three time winner in 2020, 2022 and 2023.

Craig Lowndes, who was a protégé of Brock, and has followed his path in terms of success and popularity, has won the race seven times. He has won three Bathurst races in a Falcon (2006–08) and four in a Commodore (1996, 2010, 2015 and 2018), and also holds the record for most Bathurst podiums, with fourteen.

Larry Perkins is the equal fourth most successful driver at Bathurst, with six victories (1982–84, 1993, 1995 and 1997). Like Jim Richards, Perkins achieved three of his victories as co-drivers with Brock in consecutive years in the Holden Dealer Team era.

Mark Skaife has also won six times. His first won in 1991 with a Nissan Skyline GT-R, then again in 1992 with the same car, and in 2001, 2002, 2005 and 2010 in a Holden Commodore.

Garth Tander is also a six-time winner at Bathurst, five of which came in Holden Commodores. His sixth and most recent win came in 2025, his first in a Ford.

Jamie Whincup, the driver with the most championship titles in ATCC/Supercars history, is a four-time winner of the race. His first three wins were with Craig Lowndes, with his fourth coming in 2012 with Paul Dumbrell.

Canadian-born Allan Moffat is Ford's most successful Bathurst driver, winning the race four times (1970, 1971, 1973 and 1977). The 1977 race saw Moffat and teammate Colin Bond cross the finish line side by side after opening up an indomitable lead in the early laps.

Dick Johnson first rose to fame during the 1980 race when his privately entered Ford Falcon hit a rock that had fallen (or been pushed; the topic is still debated) onto the track. Thanks to public donations of over A$70,000 – and a matching donation from Ford – Johnson was able to rebuild his car and win the Bathurst race the following year. He went on to win twice more, in 1989 and 1994.

== List of winners ==
Year	Event name	Driver(s)	Team	Car	Laps Elapsed time	Race average speed
Phillip Island (500 Miles)
1960	Armstrong 500^{1}	(Australia) John Roxburgh (Australia) Frank Coad		Vauxhall Cresta	167 laps 8h 19m 59.1s	96.56 km/h 60.00 mph
1961	Armstrong 500^{1}	(Australia) Bob Jane (Australia) Harry Firth		Mercedes-Benz 220SE	167 laps 8h 18m 0.0s	96.95 km/h 60.24 mph
1962	Armstrong 500^{1}	(Australia) Harry Firth (Australia) Bob Jane		Ford XL Falcon	167 laps 8h 15m 16.0s	97.48 km/h 60.57 mph
Mount Panorama (500 Miles)
1963	Armstrong 500^{1}	(Australia) Harry Firth (Australia) Bob Jane		Ford Cortina Mk.I GT	130 laps 7h 46m 59.1s	103.39 km/h 64.24 mph
1964	Armstrong 500^{1}	(Australia) Bob Jane (Australia) George Reynolds		Ford Cortina Mk.I GT	130 laps	—N/a
1965	Armstrong 500	(Australia) Barry Seton (Australia) Midge Bosworth		Ford Cortina Mk.I GT500	130 laps 7h 16m 45.1s	110.54 km/h 68.69 mph
1966	Gallaher 500	(Finland) Rauno Aaltonen (Australia) Bob Holden		Morris Cooper S	130 laps 7h 11m 29.1s	111.89 km/h 69.53 mph
1967	Gallaher 500	(Australia) Harry Firth (Australia) Fred Gibson		Ford XR Falcon GT	130 laps 6h 54m 59.1s	116.34 km/h 72.29 mph
1968	Hardie-Ferodo 500	(Australia) Bruce McPhee (Australia) Barry Mulholland		Holden HK Monaro GTS327	130 laps 6h 44m 7.9s	119.51 km/h 74.26 mph
1969	Hardie-Ferodo 500	(Australia) Colin Bond (Australia) Tony Roberts		Holden HT Monaro GTS350	130 laps 6h 32m 25s	123.16 km/h 76.53 mph
1970	Hardie-Ferodo 500	(Canada) Allan Moffat		Ford XW Falcon GTHO Phase II	130 laps 6h 34m 26s	122.85 km/h 76.34 mph
1971	Hardie-Ferodo 500	(Canada) Allan Moffat		Ford XY Falcon GTHO Phase III	130 laps 6h 9m 49.5s	130.55 km/h 81.12 mph
1972	Hardie-Ferodo 500	(Australia) Peter Brock		Holden LJ Torana GTR XU-1	130 laps 6h 0m 59.1s	133.74 km/h 83.10 mph
Mount Panorama (1,000 Kilometres)
1973	Hardie-Ferodo 1000	(Canada) Allan Moffat (Australia) Ian Geoghegan		Ford XA Falcon GT Hardtop	163 laps 7h 20m 6.8s	136.33 km/h 84.71 mph
1974	Hardie-Ferodo 1000	(Australia) John Goss (Australia) Kevin Bartlett		Ford XA Falcon GT Hardtop	163 laps 7h 50m 59.1s	127.39 km/h 79.16 mph
1975	Hardie-Ferodo 1000	(Australia) Peter Brock (Australia) Brian Sampson		Holden LH Torana SL/R 5000 L34	163 laps 7h 19m 11.3s	136.62 km/h 84.89 mph
1976	Hardie-Ferodo 1000	(Australia) Bob Morris (United Kingdom) John Fitzpatrick		Holden LH Torana SL/R 5000 L34	163 laps 7h 7m 12.0s	140.45 km/h 87.27 mph
1977	Hardie-Ferodo 1000	(Canada) Allan Moffat (Belgium) Jacky Ickx		Ford XC Falcon GS500 Hardtop	163 laps 6h 59m 7.8s	143.15 km/h 88.95 mph
1978	Hardie-Ferodo 1000	(Australia) Peter Brock (New Zealand) Jim Richards		Holden LX Torana A9X SS Hatchback	163 laps 6h 45m 53.9s	147.82 km/h 91.85 mph
1979	Hardie-Ferodo 1000	(Australia) Peter Brock (New Zealand) Jim Richards		Holden LX Torana A9X SS Hatchback	163 laps 6h 38m 15.8s	150.65 km/h 93.61 mph
1980	Hardie-Ferodo 1000	(Australia) Peter Brock (New Zealand) Jim Richards		Holden VC Commodore	163 laps 6h 47m 52.7s	147.10 km/h 91.41 mph
1981	James Hardie 1000	(Australia) Dick Johnson (Australia) John French		Ford XD Falcon	120 laps^{2} 4h 53m 52.7s	150.31 km/h 93.40 mph
1982	James Hardie 1000	(Australia) Peter Brock (Australia) Larry Perkins		Holden VH Commodore SS	163 laps 6h 32m 3.2s	153.04 km/h 95.09 mph
1983	James Hardie 1000	(Australia) John Harvey (Australia) Peter Brock (Australia) Larry Perkins		Holden VH Commodore SS	163 laps 6h 28m 31.6s	154.43 km/h 95.96 mph
1984	James Hardie 1000	(Australia) Peter Brock (Australia) Larry Perkins		Holden VK Commodore	163 laps 6h 23m 13.6s	156.57 km/h 97.29 mph
1985	James Hardie 1000	(Australia) John Goss (West Germany) Armin Hahne		Jaguar XJ-S	163 laps 6h 41m 30.19s	149.44 km/h 92.86 mph
1986	James Hardie 1000	(Australia) Allan Grice (Australia) Graeme Bailey		Holden VK Commodore SS Group A	163 laps 6h 30m 35.68s	153.61 km/h 95.45 mph
1987	James Hardie 1000	(Australia) Peter McLeod (Australia) Peter Brock (Australia) David Parsons		Holden VL Commodore SS Group A	158 laps^{3} 7h 1m 8.4s	139.82 km/h^{4} 86.88 mph
1988	Tooheys 1000	(Australia) Tony Longhurst (Australia) Tomas Mezera		Ford Sierra RS500	161 laps 7h 2m 10.28s	142.12 km/h 88.31 mph
1989	Tooheys 1000	(Australia) Dick Johnson (Australia) John Bowe		Ford Sierra RS500	161 laps 6h 30m 53.44s	153.50 km/h 95.38 mph
1990	Tooheys 1000	(United Kingdom) Win Percy (Australia) Allan Grice		Holden VL Commodore SS Group A SV	161 laps 6h 40m 52.64s	149.67 km/h 93.00 mph
1991	Tooheys 1000	(New Zealand) Jim Richards (Australia) Mark Skaife	Nissan Motorsport Australia	Nissan Skyline BNR32 GT-R	161 laps 6h 19m 14.80s	158.21 km/h 98.31 mph
1992	Tooheys 1000	(Australia) Mark Skaife (New Zealand) Jim Richards	Winfield Team Nissan	Nissan Skyline BNR32 GT-R	143 laps^{2} 6h 27m 16.22s	137.61 km/h 85.51 mph
1993	Tooheys 1000	(Australia) Larry Perkins (Australia) Gregg Hansford		Holden VP Commodore	161 laps 6h 29m 6.69s	154.19 km/h 95.81 mph
1994	Tooheys 1000	(Australia) Dick Johnson (Australia) John Bowe		Ford EB Falcon	161 laps 7h 3m 45.8425s	141.5882 km/h 87.9788 mph
1995	Tooheys 1000	(Australia) Larry Perkins (Australia) Russell Ingall		Holden VR Commodore	161 laps 6h 20m 32.4766s	157.6701 km/h 97.9717 mph
1996	AMP Bathurst 1000	(Australia) Craig Lowndes (New Zealand) Greg Murphy		Holden VR Commodore	161 laps 7h 9m 28.3584s	139.7062 km/h 86.8094 mph
1997	AMP Bathurst 1000	(Australia) Geoff Brabham (Australia) David Brabham	BMW Motorsport Australia	BMW 320i	161 laps 6h 41m 25.4072s^{5}	149.4681 km/h 92.8752 mph
1997	Primus 1000 Classic^{6}	(Australia) Larry Perkins (Australia) Russell Ingall	Perkins Engineering	Holden VS Commodore	161 laps 6h 21m 55.5483s	157.0986 km/h 97.6165 mph
1998	AMP Bathurst 1000	(Sweden) Rickard Rydell (New Zealand) Jim Richards	Volvo S40 Racing	Volvo S40	161 laps 6h 54m 23.4756s	144.7907 km/h 89.9688 mph
1998	FAI 1000^{6}	(Australia) Jason Bright (New Zealand) Steven Richards	Stone Brothers Racing	Ford EL Falcon	161 laps 6h 42m 23.9039s	149.1060 km/h 92.6501 mph
1999	FAI 1000	(New Zealand) Steven Richards (New Zealand) Greg Murphy	Gibson Motorsport	Holden VT Commodore	161 laps 6h 51m 48.8354s	145.6969 km/h 90.5318 mph
2000	FAI 1000	(Australia) Garth Tander (Australia) Jason Bargwanna	Garry Rogers Motorsport	Holden VT Commodore	161 laps 7h 23m 30.2348s	135.3259 km/h 84.0876 mph
2001	V8 Supercar 1000	(Australia) Mark Skaife (Australia) Tony Longhurst	Holden Racing Team	Holden VX Commodore	161 laps 6h 50m 33.1789s	146.1872 km/h 90.8365 mph
2002	Bob Jane T-Marts 1000	(Australia) Mark Skaife (New Zealand) Jim Richards	Holden Racing Team	Holden VX Commodore	161 laps 6h 58m 41.0260s	143.3482 km/h 89.0724 mph
2003	Bob Jane T-Marts 1000	(New Zealand) Greg Murphy (Australia) Rick Kelly	K-Mart Racing Team	Holden VY Commodore	161 laps 6h 32m 55.4044s	152.7463 km/h 94.9121 mph
2004	Bob Jane T-Marts 1000	(New Zealand) Greg Murphy (Australia) Rick Kelly	K-Mart Racing Team	Holden VY Commodore	161 laps 6h 29m 36.2055s	154.0479 km/h 95.7209 mph
2005	Supercheap Auto 1000	(Australia) Mark Skaife (Australia) Todd Kelly	Holden Racing Team	Holden VZ Commodore	161 laps 6h 37m 17.0012s	151.0700 km/h 93.8705 mph
2006	Supercheap Auto Bathurst 1000	(Australia) Craig Lowndes (Australia) Jamie Whincup	Triple Eight Race Engineering	Ford BA Falcon	161 laps 6h 59m 53.5852s	142.9354 km/h 88.8159 mph
2007	Supercheap Auto Bathurst 1000	(Australia) Craig Lowndes (Australia) Jamie Whincup	Triple Eight Race Engineering	Ford BF Falcon	161 laps 6h 29m 10.1985s	154.2195 km/h 95.8275 mph
2008	Supercheap Auto Bathurst 1000	(Australia) Craig Lowndes (Australia) Jamie Whincup	Triple Eight Race Engineering	Ford BF Falcon	161 laps 6h 26m 0.4291s	155.4831 km/h 96.6127 mph
2009	Supercheap Auto Bathurst 1000	(Australia) Will Davison (Australia) Garth Tander	Holden Racing Team	Holden VE Commodore	161 laps 6h 40m 2.4884s	150.0284 km/h 93.2233 mph
2010	Supercheap Auto Bathurst 1000	(Australia) Craig Lowndes (Australia) Mark Skaife	Triple Eight Race Engineering	Holden VE Commodore	161 laps 6h 12m 51.4153s	160.9668 km/h 100.0201 mph
2011	Supercheap Auto Bathurst 1000	(Australia) Garth Tander (Australia) Nick Percat	Holden Racing Team	Holden VE Commodore	161 laps 6h 26m 52.2691s	155.0904 km/h 96.3294 mph
2012	Supercheap Auto Bathurst 1000	(Australia) Jamie Whincup (Australia) Paul Dumbrell	Triple Eight Race Engineering	Holden VE Commodore	161 laps 6h 16m 1.3304s	159.6118 km/h 99.1782 mph
2013	Supercheap Auto Bathurst 1000	(Australia) Mark Winterbottom (New Zealand) Steven Richards	Ford Performance Racing	Ford FG Falcon	161 laps 6h 11m 27.9315s	161.5697 km/h 100.3948 mph
2014	Supercheap Auto Bathurst 1000	(Australia) Chaz Mostert (Australia) Paul Morris	Ford Performance Racing	Ford FG Falcon	161 laps 7h 58m 53.2052s^{7}	125.3273 km/h 77.8914 mph
2015	Supercheap Auto Bathurst 1000	(Australia) Craig Lowndes (New Zealand) Steven Richards	Triple Eight Race Engineering	Holden VF Commodore	161 laps 6h 16m 7.7064s	159.5667 km/h 99.1714 mph
2016	Supercheap Auto Bathurst 1000	(Australia) Will Davison (Australia) Jonathon Webb	Tekno Autosports	Holden VF Commodore	161 laps 6h 19m 25.3237s^{8}	158.1816 km/h 98.3105 mph
2017	Supercheap Auto Bathurst 1000	(Australia) David Reynolds (Australia) Luke Youlden	Erebus Motorsport	Holden VF Commodore	161 laps 7h 11m 45.5456s	139.0071 km/h 86.3844 mph
2018	Supercheap Auto Bathurst 1000	(Australia) Craig Lowndes (New Zealand) Steven Richards	Triple Eight Race Engineering	Holden ZB Commodore	161 laps 6h 1m 44.8637s	165.9100 km/h 103.0917 mph
2019	Supercheap Auto Bathurst 1000	(New Zealand) Scott McLaughlin (France) Alexandre Prémat	DJR Team Penske	Ford Mustang GT	161 laps 6h 27m 51.5260s	154.7408 km/h 96.1515 mph
2020	Supercheap Auto Bathurst 1000	(New Zealand) Shane van Gisbergen (Australia) Garth Tander	Triple Eight Race Engineering	Holden ZB Commodore	161 laps 6h 10m 56.1143s	161.8006 km/h 100.5385 mph
2021	Repco Bathurst 1000	(Australia) Chaz Mostert (Australia) Lee Holdsworth	Walkingshaw Andretti United	Holden ZB Commodore	161 laps 6h 15m 6.1952s	160.0028 km/h 99.4211 mph
2022	Repco Bathurst 1000	(New Zealand) Shane van Gisbergen (Australia) Garth Tander	Triple Eight Race Engineering	Holden ZB Commodore	161 laps 6h 41m 53.7220s	149.3363 km/h 92.7933 mph
2023	Repco Bathurst 1000	(New Zealand) Shane van Gisbergen (New Zealand) Richie Stanaway	Triple Eight Race Engineering	Chevrolet Camaro ZL1-1LE	161 laps 6h 7m 7.4957s	163.4800 km/h 101.5818 mph
2024	Repco Bathurst 1000	(Australia) Brodie Kostecki (Australia) Todd Hazelwood	Erebus Motorsport	Chevrolet Camaro ZL1-1LE	161 laps 5h 58m 3.0649s	167.6230 km/h 104.1561 mph
2025	Repco Bathurst 1000	(New Zealand) Matthew Payne (Australia) Garth Tander	Grove Racing	Ford Mustang S650	161 laps 6h 52m 14.9378s^{8}	145.5858 km/h 90.4628 mph
2026	Repco Bathurst 1000	(Australia) Brodie Kostecki (Australia) Todd Hazelwood	Dick Johnson Racing	Ford Mustang S650	161 laps 5h 54m 4.7490s^{9}	169.5033 km/h 105.3245 mph

Notes:
^1 – Outright race winner was not officially recognised until 1965. Prior to that official results reflected four or five class races occurring simultaneously rather than a single race. The first car across the finish line has been retrospectively referred to as outright race winner since then.
^2 – Race was stopped before full race distance.
^3 – The first and second position finishers were disqualified post race.
^4 – This is the first year with the newly added Chase in Conrod Straight.
^5 – The first position finisher was disqualified post race.
^6 – Denotes Australia 1000 races for V8 Supercars category.
^7 – Race was stopped for over an hour due to the track surface breaking up and requiring repair. Stoppage time is included in final race time.
^8 – The first position finisher was assessed a post-race time penalty for violating driving standards.
^9 – Race record for time elapsed & average speed.

== Records and statistics ==
=== Multiple winners ===
==== By driver ====
Wins	Driver	Years
9	(Australia) Peter Brock	1972, 1975, 1978, 1979, 1980, 1982, 1983, 1984, 1987
7	(New Zealand) Jim Richards	1978, 1979, 1980, 1991, 1992, 1998, 2002
7	(Australia) Craig Lowndes	1996, 2006, 2007, 2008, 2010, 2015, 2018
6	(Australia) Larry Perkins	1982, 1983, 1984, 1993, 1995, 1997
6	(Australia) Mark Skaife	1991, 1992, 2001, 2002, 2005, 2010
6	(Australia) Garth Tander	2000, 2009, 2011, 2020, 2022, 2025
5	(New Zealand) Steven Richards	1998, 1999, 2013, 2015, 2018
4	(Australia) Bob Jane	1961, 1962, 1963, 1964
4	(Australia) Harry Firth	1961, 1962, 1963, 1967
4	(Canada) Allan Moffat	1970, 1971, 1973, 1977
4	(New Zealand) Greg Murphy	1996, 1999, 2003, 2004
4	(Australia) Jamie Whincup	2006, 2007, 2008, 2012
3	(Australia) Dick Johnson	1981, 1989, 1994
3	(New Zealand) Shane van Gisbergen	2020, 2022, 2023
2	(Australia) John Goss	1974, 1985
2	(Australia) Allan Grice	1986, 1990
2	(Australia) John Bowe	1989, 1994
2	(Australia) Russell Ingall	1995, 1997
2	(Australia) Tony Longhurst	1988, 2001
2	(Australia) Rick Kelly	2003, 2004
2	(Australia) Will Davison	2009, 2016
2	(Australia) Chaz Mostert	2014, 2021
2	(Australia) Brodie Kostecki	2024, 2026
2	(Australia) Todd Hazelwood	2024, 2026

==== By entrant ====
Wins	Entrant
10	Triple Eight Race Engineering
9	Holden Dealer Team
8	Walkinshaw Andretti United
7	Ford Works Team
6	Dick Johnson Racing
3	Perkins Engineering
3	Gibson Motorsport
2	K-Mart Racing Team
2	Ford Performance Racing
2	Erebus Motorsport

==== By manufacturer ====
Wins	Manufacturer
36	Holden
23	Ford
2	Chevrolet
2	Nissan

=== Most pole positions ===
==== By driver ====
Rank	Driver	Poles	Years
1	(Australia) Peter Brock	6	1974–1989
2	(Australia) Mark Skaife	5	1991–2006
3	(Canada) Allan Moffat	4	1970–1976

==== By manufacturer ====
Rank	Manufacturer	Poles	Years
1	Ford	26	1967–2025
2	Holden	24	1968–2022
3	Chevrolet	5	1980–2026

=== Most starts ===
Rank	Driver	Starts	Years
1	(New Zealand) Jim Richards	35	1974–2006
2	(Australia) Craig Lowndes	33	1994–2026
3	(Australia) Peter Brock	32	1969–2004

=== Most podiums ===
Rank	Driver	Podiums	Years
1	(Australia) Craig Lowndes	14	1994–2018
2	(Australia) Peter Brock	12	1969–1987
2	(Australia) Larry Perkins	12	1977–1998
2	(New Zealand) Jim Richards	12	1974–2002

=== Race records ===
Description	Record	Driver/s	Car	Year
Race record	5:54:04.7490 (161 laps)	(Australia) Brodie Kostecki (Australia) Todd Hazelwood	Ford Mustang S650	2026
Lap record	2:04.7602	(Australia) Chaz Mostert	Ford Mustang GT	2019
Largest winning margin	6 laps	(Australia) Peter Brock (New Zealand) Jim Richards	Holden LX Torana SS A9X Hatchback	1979
Smallest winning margin	0.1434s	(Australia) Will Davison (Australia) Jonathon Webb	Holden VF Commodore	2016

=== Qualifying records ===
Description	Record	Driver	Car	Year
Qualifying record	2:03.3736	(Australia) Chaz Mostert	Holden ZB Commodore	2021

=== Driver records ===
Description	Record	Driver	Car	Year
Youngest race winner	20y 268d	(Australia) Rick Kelly	Holden VY Commodore	2003
Oldest race winner	55y 41d	(New Zealand) Jim Richards	Holden VX Commodore	2002
Youngest race starter	17y 67d	(Australia) Cam Waters	Holden VE Commodore	2011

== Deaths ==
In the over fifty-year history of the event, three drivers have died whilst competing in the Bathurst 1000.

In 1986, Sydney accountant and privateer entrant Mike Burgmann became the first fatality in the race's history when his car, a Holden VK Commodore SS Group A, travelling at 260 km/h (160 mph), struck the tyre barrier at the base of the Armor All Bridge (then sponsored by John Player Special) on the high-speed straight known as Conrod Straight. "The Chase", a large three-corner chicane added in 1987 to the straight, was dedicated to Burgmann with a plaque embedded in the concrete barriers.

In 1992, 1967 Formula One World Champion Denny Hulme, after complaining of blurred vision, suffered a heart attack at the wheel of his BMW M3 Evolution whilst travelling along Conrod Straight. After veering into the wall on the left side of the track, his car came to a relatively controlled stop on the opposite side of the course. When marshals reached the scene, Hulme was unconscious and he was pronounced dead at Bathurst Hospital after suffering a second heart attack.

In 1994, Melbourne privateer entrant Don Watson died during practice. His car, a Holden VP Commodore, had a mechanical failure and went straight ahead at the entry to The Chase, hitting a barrier at almost 250 km/h (160 mph).

Additionally, the 2006 event was marred by the death of New Zealand driver Mark Porter in a Development V8 Supercar Series support race on the Friday of the meeting. Porter had been scheduled to compete in the 1000 as a driver for the Brad Jones Racing team.

== Peter Brock Trophy ==
Peter Brock died weeks before the 2006 race in an accident during the Targa West rally in Western Australia. Following this, Supercars announced that from 2006 onwards, the drivers in the Bathurst 1000 would be racing to win the Peter Brock Trophy. The 2006 event also honoured Brock with special tributes; including the front row of the starting grid being left vacant, all cars bearing an '05' number sticker made famous by Brock, and a champions' lap of honour featuring Brock's past co-drivers parading in cars that Brock won Bathurst with.

The trophy, manufactured by Hardy Brothers, is inscribed with the words "King of the Mountain", a long-time nickname of Brock's. It weighs 2.5 kg (6 lb) and stands 50 cm (20 in) tall. Craig Lowndes, a long time mentee of Brock, has won the trophy a record six times since its inception.

== Event sponsors ==
The event has had several naming rights sponsors:

- 1960–65: Armstrong
- 1966–67: Gallaher
- 1968–87: James Hardie
  - 1968–80: Hardie-Ferodo
  - 1981–87: James Hardie
- 1988–95: Tooheys
- 1996–98: AMP
- 1997: Primus
- 1998–2000: FAI
- 2002–04: Bob Jane T-Marts
- 2005–20: Supercheap Auto
- 2021–present: Repco

== See also ==
- List of Bathurst 1000 vehicles
- List of female Bathurst 1000 drivers
- National Motor Racing Museum – a museum located adjacent to the racing circuit at Murray's Corner, exhibiting racing memorabilia and cars.
- Bathurst 12 Hour
- Bathurst 24 Hour
- Bathurst Motor Festival
- List of Australian Touring Car Championship races
