= 1960 Armstrong 500 =

Motor race in Australia

Seasons
- ← none 1961 →

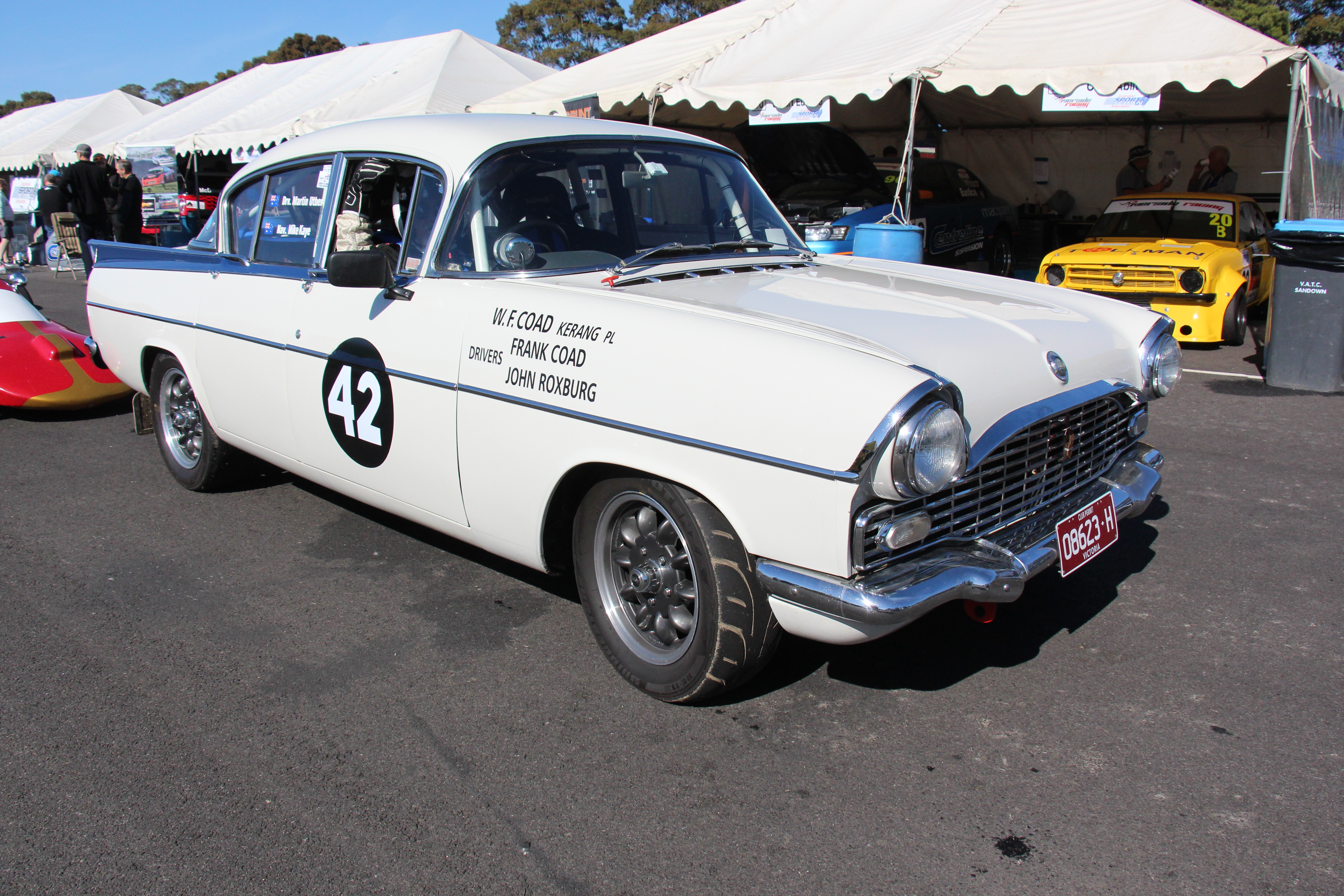
A Vauxhall Cresta, similar to the car pictured, was the first car to complete the 500 mile race.

The 1960 Armstrong 500 was an endurance motor race for Australian made or assembled standard production sedans. The event was held at the Phillip Island Grand Prix Circuit in Victoria, Australia on 20 November 1960 over 167 laps of the 3.0 mile circuit, a total distance of 501 miles.

The race was organised by the Light Car Club of Australia and promoted by Armstrong York Engineering Pty Ltd. Jim Thompson, managing director of the shock absorber manufacturer, was encouraged by his PR man Ron Thonemann to increase the company's business with major carmakers, particularly Ford and Holden, by sponsoring a race.

This was the first event held in the history of the race later to become known as the Bathurst 1000, the race that would come to dominate Australian motor racing.

== Outright controversy ==
Officially only class placings and prize money were awarded, with no outright winner recognised. In later years as the fame of the Bathurst 1000 grew, outright placings, particularly the outright winner, became more widely recognised. John Roxburgh and Frank Coad have been widely acclaimed as the outright winners of the event, and have been recognised in CAMS motorsport manual in more recent times. This has been the source of some controversy as claims the winners of Class C, Geoff Russell, David Anderson and Tony Loxton covered the race distance in a faster time. The source of the discrepancy arises from the starting procedure which saw the classes released at ten second intervals, with the Class D Roxburgh/Coad Vauxhall starting the race ten seconds before the Class C Russell/Anderson/Loxton Peugeot. A comprehensive investigation in 1992 by Graham Hoinville, utilizing the record of individual lap times from the race, concluded that the car of Frank Coad and John Roxburgh was the first to finish the race.

== Class structure ==
=== Class A ===
Class A was for cars with an engine capacity of 750cc or less. The class featured Fiat 600, Lloyd Alexander, NSU Prinz and Renault 750

=== Class B ===
Class B was for cars with an engine capacity of between 751cc and 1300cc. The class featured Ford Anglia, Renault Dauphine, Simca Aronde, Triumph Herald and Volkswagen Beetle

=== Class C ===
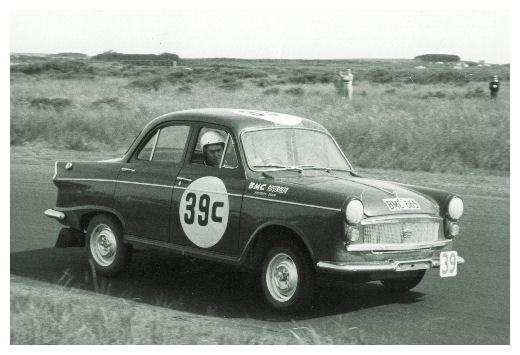
The Brian Foley / Alan Edney Austin Lancer competing in the 1960 Armstrong 500.

Class C was for cars with an engine capacity of between 1301cc and 2000cc. The class featured Austin Lancer, Hillman Minx, Morris Major, Peugeot 403 and Singer Gazelle.

=== Class D ===
Class D was for cars with an engine capacity between 2001cc and 3500cc. The class featured Ford Falcon, Humber Super Snipe, Mercedes-Benz 220SE, Standard Vanguard, Vauxhall Cresta.

=== Class E ===
Class E was for cars with an engine capacity over 3500cc. There was only one entry in the class, a Ford Customline.

== Results ==
Class results were as follows:

Pos.	No.	Entrant	Drivers	Car	Laps
Class A
1	1	Continental & General Dist.	Doug Whiteford; Lex Davison	NSU Prinz	155
2	2	Continental & General Dist.	Bruce Walton; Paul England	NSU Prinz	151
3	3	Continental & General Dist.	Hoot Gibson; J Gorman	NSU Prinz	150
4	10	W. McB. March	Bill March; John Connolly	Renault 750	145
5	15	Wal Gillespie Fiat Services	Wal Gillespie; Lou Sinclair	Fiat 600	138
6	4	Finlay Bros. P/L	Kevin Lott; G Petty	Lloyd Alexander TS	135
7	16	Torino Motors P/L	Brian Pyers; Frank Elkins	Fiat 600	135
8	5	Finlay Bros. P/L	Graham Levingston; Peter Candy	Lloyd Alexander TS	134
9	7	Finlay Bros. P/L	R Slaney; G White	Lloyd Alexander TS	132
10	8	B.P. Batteries P/L	Les Park; J Fleming	Renault 750	
DNF	9	Monash Service Station	Rex Emmett; A Hawkins	Renault 750	
DNF	6	Finlay Brothers P/L	Tony Thieler; Frank Kilfoyle	Lloyd Alexander TS	120
Class B
1	24	Melody Motors P/L	Murray Galt; Bill Murray	Simca Aronde	164
2	23	Chrysler Australia Ltd. (Eiffel Tower Group)	Jack Nougher; Lionel Marsh	Simca Aronde	161
3	22	Chrysler Australia Ltd. (B.J. Autos Service)	Bob Brown; Michael Lempriere	Simca Aronde	161
4	27	Australian Motor Industries	Jack Maurer; Ern Abbott	Triumph Herald	158
5	20	Orman's Service Station	Rex Orman; Max McPherson	Volkswagen	158
6	18	Lanock Motors Ltd.	David McKay; Greg Cusack	Volkswagen	158
7	19	Spencer Motors P/L	Arthur Wylie; Ken Wylie	Volkswagen	157
8	29	Nalders Garage	Bill Nalder; John Ampt	Ford Anglia	156
9	14	Ecurie Dauphine	J Leighton; Alan Ling	Renault Dauphine	154
10	12	Ecurie Dauphine	Des West; Ian Geoghegan	Renault Dauphine	152
11	11	Ecurie Dauphine	Bill Pitt; Leo Geoghegan	Renault Dauphine	151
DNF	17	V.W. Motors P/L	Eddie Perkins; George Reynolds	Volkswagen	151
DNF	26	Australian Motor Industries	Graham Hoinville; Austin Miller	Triumph Herald	100
DNF	25	R. Christie	Ray Christie; George Hughes	Simca Aronde	66
DNF	21	Chrysler Australia Ltd. (J.E. Murray)	Jack Murray; W Murison	Simca Aronde	
Class C
1	34	Continental & General Dist. P/L	Geoff Russell; David Anderson; Tony Loxton	Peugeot 403	167
2	41	British Motor Corp.	Peter Manton; Barry Topen	Morris Major	164
3	38	British Motor Corp.	George Spanos; Leo Taylor	Austin Lancer	161
4	35	Continental & General Dist. P/L	Bob Holden; Ken Brigden	Peugeot 403	160
5	42	British Motor Corp.	Brian Muir; Jim Smith	Morris Major	160
6	43	British Motor Corp.	Rod Murphy; John Callaway	Morris Major	159
7	45	Rootes (Aust) Limited	Harry Firth; John Reaburn	Singer Gazelle	159
8	36	Continental & General Dist. P/L	Ron Lilley; Jim Gullan	Peugeot 403	157
9	39	British Motor Corp.	Brian Foley; Alan Edney	Austin Lancer	155
DNF	44	Rootes (Aust) Limited	Bill Clemens; Don Dunoon	Hillman Minx	
DNF	40	British Motor Corp.	Barry Gurdon; Clyde Miller	Austin Lancer	59
Class D
1	37	S. A. Chenery P/L	John Roxburgh; Frank Coad	Vauxhall Cresta	167
2	28	Australian Motor Industries	Norm Beechey; John French	Standard Vanguard	162
3	30	Autoland P/L	Bob Jane; Lou Molina	Ford XK Falcon	161
DNF	46	Rootes (Aust) Limited	Bill Graetz; Fred Sutherland	Humber Super Snipe	125
DNF	47	Smith Street Motors P/L	Gavin Youl; John Youl	Mercedes-Benz 220SE	67
DNF	31	Wangaratta Motors	Ron Phillips; Ern Seeliger	Ford XK Falcon	49
Class E
1	32	Sabina Motors P/L	Ray Gibbs; Murray Carter	Ford Customline	154

== Statistics ==
- Fastest Lap - #47 Youl/Youl - 2:41 - Laps 15, 45 & 62
- Race Time of Car No. 37 : 8:20:45
