= Frank Coad =

Australian racing driver (1930–2021)

Frank Coad (3 September 1930 – November 2021) was an Australian racing driver.

Coad died in November 2021, at the age of 91.

Sporting positions
Preceded by inaugural	Winner of the Phillip Island 500; 1960 (with John Roxburgh)	Succeeded by Bob Jane; Harry Firth
