= Willi Sturm =

German water polo player (1928–1993)

Personal information
- Nationality: German
- Born: 28 January 1928 Střekov, Czechoslovakia
- Died: 5 August 1993 (aged 65)

Sport
- Sport: Water polo

Willi Sturm (28 January 1928 – 5 August 1993) was a German water polo player. He competed at the 1952 Summer Olympics and the 1956 Summer Olympics.
