= Rodolfo Tommasi =

Italian footballer

Personal information
- Full name: Rodolfo Tommasi
- Date of birth: 24 November 1907
- Place of birth: Abbazia, Austria-Hungary
- Date of death: 13 August 1993 (aged 85)
- Place of death: Opatija, Croatia
- Height: 1.85 m (6 ft 1 in)
- Position: Forward

Senior career*
Years	Team	Apps	(Gls)
1924–1926	Olympia Abbazia		
1928–1929	Fiorentina	7	(0)
1929–1931	Fiumana	59	(13)
1931–1932	Triestina	13	(3)
1932–1933	BSK Belgrade	3	(1)
1933–1936	Fiumana	20	(0)
- * Club domestic league appearances and goals

Rodolfo Tommasi (24 November 1907 – 13 August 1993) was an Italian footballer.

Born in Abbazia, Austria-Hungary, he played as a forward for several Italian clubs. He started playing with local Olympia Abbazia, then he had a spell with ACF Fiorentina in the 1928–29 Divisione Nazionale. Between 1929 and 1931 he played with Fiumana in the Serie B and then with Triestina in the 1931–32 Serie A.

He also played abroad, with BSK Belgrade in the 1932–33 Yugoslav Football Championship. While playing in Yugoslavia he played as Rudolf Tomašić.

He died in his birthplace, in 1993, then known as Opatija and part of Croatia.
