= John Roxburgh (racing driver) =

Australian racing driver

John Bayles Roxburgh (25 April 1932 – 2 August 1993) was an Australian racing driver, and motor sports administrator.

Roxburgh's career was highlighted by taking victory in the original 1960 Armstrong 500 (known later as the Bathurst 1000), co-driving a Vauxhall Cresta with Frank Coad. Roxburgh continued to race touring cars well into the 1970s, most notably racing for the factory supported Datsun Racing Team. He won Class A at Bathurst in 1967 driving a Datsun 1000 (B10 series), and Class B in 1968 in a Datsun 1600 (510 series), co-driving with triple Australian Grand Prix winner Doug Whiteford on each occasion.

Roxburgh also won the 1962 Six Hour Le Mans at Caversham in Western Australia driving a Lotus 15 with Derek Jolly.

Roxburgh later turned to the administration of the sport, serving as CAMS President from 1977 to 1982 and later being an Australian delegate to the FIA where he also served as a track safety inspector and chairman, famously not passing the street circuit for the inaugural Wellington 500 in 1985, forcing the organisers to re-write the race regulations to make it a national rather than international race to allow it to proceed.

Roxburgh died in 1993, aged 61. He was the first winner of the Bathurst 1000 and its predecessors to die.

Sporting positions
Preceded by inaugural	Winner of the Philip Island 500; 1960 (with Frank Coad)	Succeeded by Bob Jane; Harry Firth
