= Kalevi Lilja =

Finnish footballer (1925-1993)

Personal information
- Date of birth: 10 September 1925
- Date of death: 15 August 1993 (aged 67)
- Position: Defender

International career
Years	Team	Apps	(Gls)
1952–1956	Finland	2	(0)

Kalevi Lilja (10 September 1925 – 15 August 1993) was a Finnish footballer. He played in two matches for the Finland national football team from 1952 to 1956. He was also part of Finland's squad for the 1952 Summer Olympics, but he did not play in any matches.
