= Karl Bewerunge =

German politician (1913–1993)

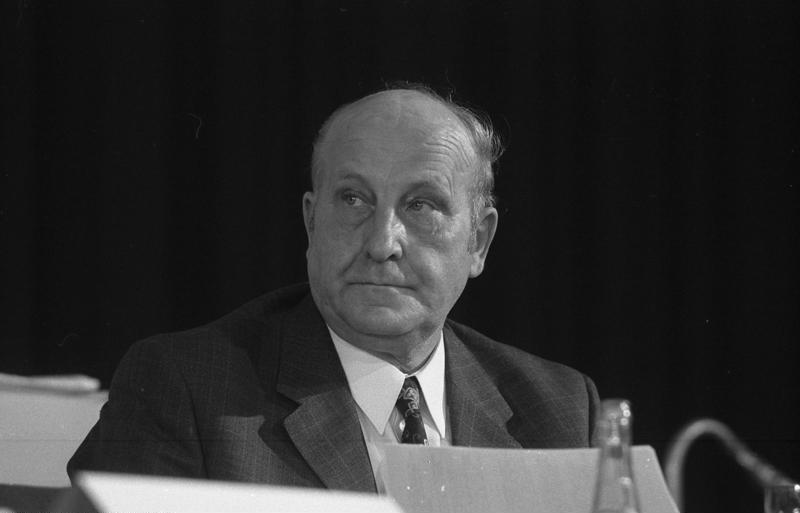
- Karl Bewerunge (1972)

Member of the Bundestag
- In office 17 October 1961 – 13 December 1976

Personal details
- Born: 20 January 1913 Heedfeld
- Died: 26 August 1993 (aged 80) Lüdenscheid, North Rhine-Westphalia, Germany
- Party: CDU
- Occupation: Farmer

Karl Bewerunge (20 January 1913 – 26 August 1993) was a German politician of the Christian Democratic Union (CDU) and former member of the German Bundestag.

== Life ==
After the Second World War, Bewerunge became a member of the CDU. He had been a member of the district council and a member of the district committee since 1953. He was a member of the German Bundestag from 1961 to 1976. From 1969 onwards he was deputy chairman of the Committee for Food, Agriculture and Forestry. He had always entered parliament via the state list of the CDU North Rhine-Westphalia.

== Literature ==
Herbst, Ludolf; Jahn, Bruno (2002). Vierhaus, Rudolf (ed.). Biographisches Handbuch der Mitglieder des Deutschen Bundestages. 1949–2002 [Biographical Handbook of the Members of the German Bundestag. 1949–2002] (in German). München: De Gruyter - De Gruyter Saur. p. 1715. ISBN 978-3-11-184511-1.
