= Jack Maher (Australian footballer) =

Australian rules footballer, born 1916

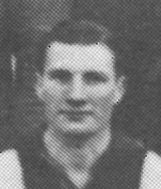

Personal information
- Full name: John Sylvester Joseph Maher
- Born: 10 July 1916; Fitzroy North, Victoria
- Died: 26 August 1993 (aged 77); South Perth, Western Australia
- Original team: Old Xaverians
- Height: 178 cm (5 ft 10 in)
- Weight: 78 kg (172 lb)

Playing career^{1}
Years	Club	Games (Goals)
1938–40, 1944	Melbourne	28 (10)
- ^{1} Playing statistics correct to the end of 1944.

John Sylvester Joseph Maher (10 July 1916 – 26 August 1993) was an Australian rules footballer who played with Melbourne in the Victorian Football League (VFL).
