= Jim Bolwell =

Australian rules footballer, born 1911

Personal information
- Full name: James Francis Bolwell
- Born: 27 August 1911; Horsham, Victoria
- Died: 15 August 1993 (aged 81); Frankston, Victoria
- Original team: Brighton

Playing career^{1}
Years	Club	Games (Goals)
1933	North Melbourne	1 (0)
- ^{1} Playing statistics correct to the end of 1933.

James Francis Bolwell (27 August 1911 – 15 August 1993) was an Australian rules footballer who played with North Melbourne in the Victorian Football League (VFL).
