= Ford works team (Australia) =

The Ford works team was the unofficial name for an Australian motor racing team which was supported by Ford Australia. The team was formed in 1962 and was disbanded when Ford Australia withdrew from motor racing at the end of 1973. Drivers for the works team included Allan Moffat, Fred Gibson, Harry Firth, Bob Jane, Barry Seton, Bruce McPhee, John French, Ian Geoghegan and his brother Leo Geoghegan. Ford Australia also supported a factory rally team in Australia from 1977 to 1980.

== The Firth years ==
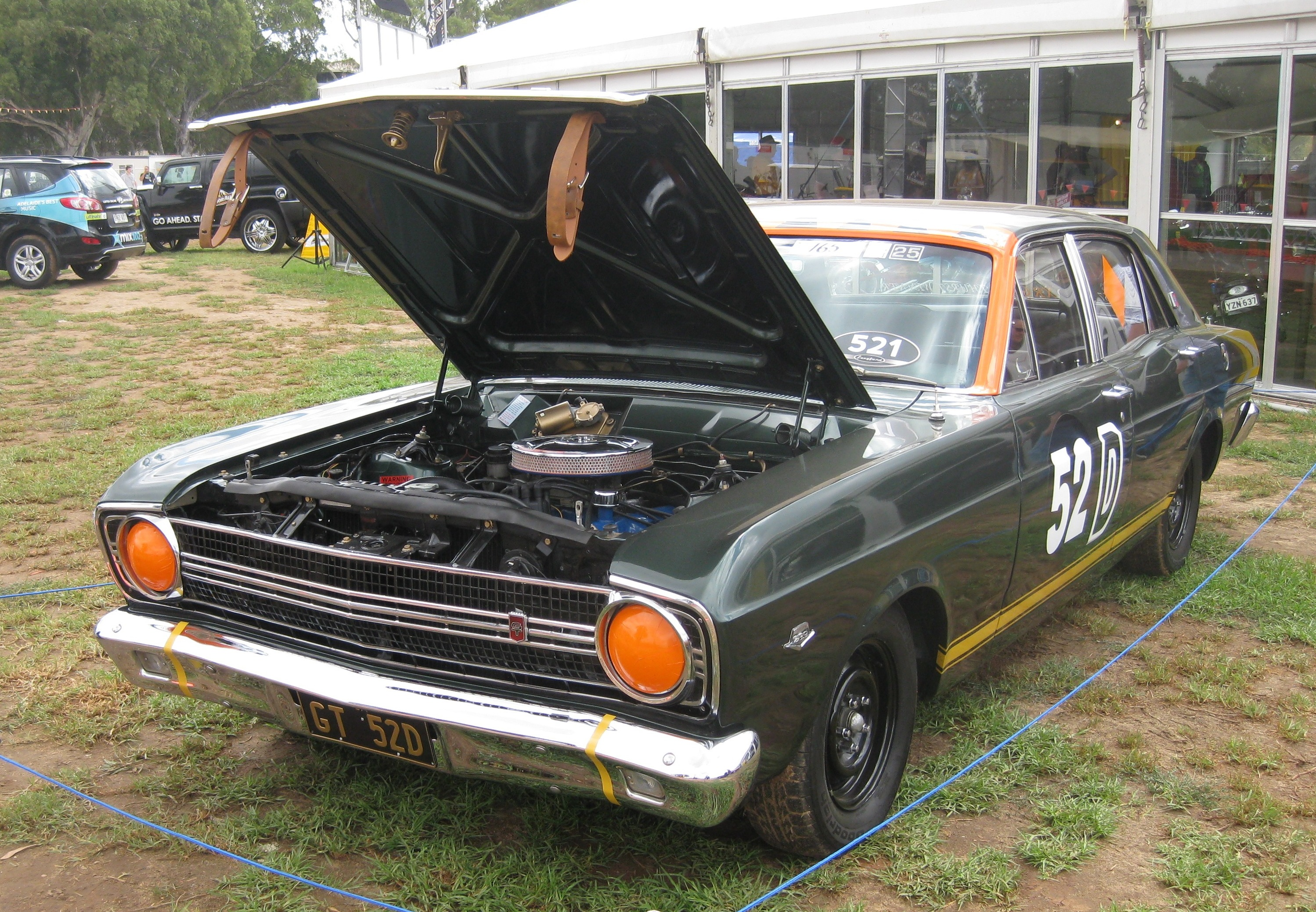
A "race replica" of the Ford Australia entered Ford XR Falcon GT driven to victory in the 1967 Gallaher 500 by Harry Firth and Fred Gibson

In 1962 the Firth Motors workshop at Queens Avenue, Auburn (Melbourne), became the base for the Ford works team with Harry Firth as team manager. At the 1962 Armstrong 500 at Phillip Island Firth and Jane drove a Ford XL Falcon to victory and the following year won again this time in a Ford Cortina Mk.I GT at the first Armstrong 500 run at Bathurst. In 1964 Bob Jane and George Reynolds were first across the line at Bathurst in a works Cortina GT and also that year Harry Firth took out the Ampol Trial.

1966 saw Firth and navigator Graham Hoinville take out the inaugural Southern Cross Rally in a Cortina. In 1967 Firth won another Bathurst 500 with co-driver Fred Gibson in a 4.7-litre (289 cui) Ford XR Falcon GT, with the Geoghegan brothers finishing in second place after a re-count of the lap scores (The Geoghegan's were actually flagged in first, but they had mistakenly been credited with a lap early in the race when Leo Geoghegan ran out of fuel just after the pits and returned to pit lane via the back of the pits. Firth knew this and successfully protested against his team mates). It was the first time a V8 powered car had won the race. Then in 1968 Firth and Hoinville won the first Australian Rally Championship in a Cortina.

At the 1968 Hardie-Ferodo 500 at Bathurst, Ford introduced the Ford XT Falcon GT, now powered by the 5.0 L 302 cui V8 engine. However, rival manufacturer Holden had introduced the Holden Monaro GTS327 powered by a 5.3 L (327 cui) Chevrolet V8 engine. While the Monaros would prove slightly faster than the Falcons in 1968, late in the race the works Ford of Fred Gibson and 1965 race winner Barry Seton was leading until a stone from the circuit thrown by another car put a hole in the radiator and ended their race on lap 113, though they were classified in 31st place. The Geoghegan brothers' Falcon GT would finish in 12th place. They had planned to go the whole race without changing their brakes as they had done in 1967 (despite warnings from Firth that they were not taking into account the increased pace), but this backfired and they lost 7 laps in the pits after the worn brake pads welded themselves to the brake rotors. The third works entry (using an automatic transmission and running in Class C) driven by Barry Arentz and Mike Champion finished in 11th place.

== Allan Moffat and Al Turner ==
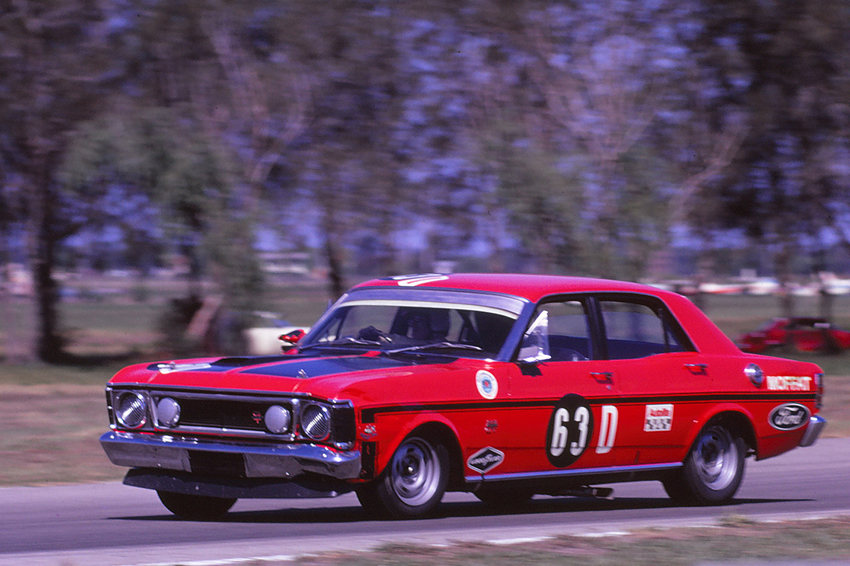
Works Ford Falcon GTHO Phase II in 1970/71

After some impressive performances in his Ford Mustang Boss 302 Improved Production touring car in 1969, Canadian-born Allan Moffat joined the Ford team and became the team's No.1 driver. With Harry Firth switching to Holden and forming the Holden Dealer Team, American Al Turner was signed up as the new team manager.

The Ford XW Falcon GTHO Phase I powered by the 5.8 L, 351 "Windsor" V8 engine looked to be a big threat at the 1969 Hardie-Ferodo 500 against the new Holden HT Monaro GTS350 with the GTHO's proving to have a slight speed advantage over the 5.7 L, 350 Chevrolet V8 powered Monaros, but Al Turner's tactic of flying in untested special tyres from the USA proved to be the undoing of the Ford challenge as Falcons kept pulling into the pits with shredded tyres. Ironically, the one Ford works car that did not chew through its tyres was the one driven by Moffat and Allan Hamilton. Moffat contends that, had he not been called into the pits early to change tyres after the failures on the Geoghegan brothers' car and the Gibson/Seton car, he would have won the race. Unlike Pete Geoghegan and Fred Gibson, Moffat had looked after his tyres and the unscheduled stop ultimately cost the team victory. Following the race, Ford took the extraordinary step of running a full page newspaper add with the caption of "We were a little deflated".

The 1970 Bathurst race was a 1–2 victory for the Ford works team with Allan Moffat winning his first Bathurst 500 in a Ford XW Falcon GTHO Phase II from team-mate Bruce McPhee whose car was much healthier but was holding back in the final laps following team orders. The Phase II GTHO Falcon's, while still using a 5.8 L V8 engine, were now using the Australian manufactured 351 "Cleveland" engine rather than the imported 351 Windsor engines.

== Howard Marsden and more Moffat victories ==
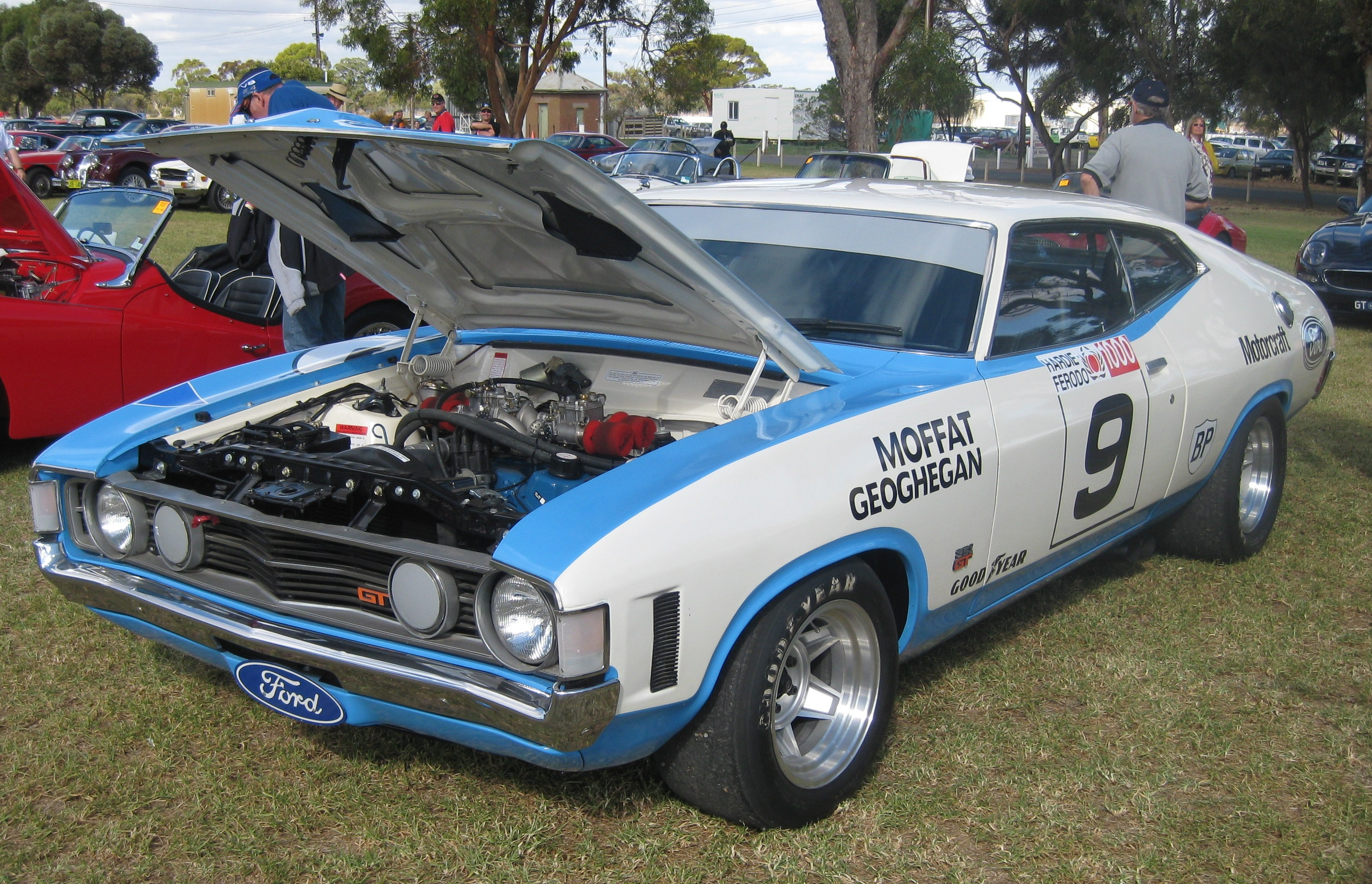
Replica of the factory entered Ford XA Falcon GT Hardtop which won the 1973 Hardie-Ferodo 1000

By 1971 Howard Marsden was the new team manager at Ford. Moffat drove his Ford XY Falcon GTHO Phase III to an 'all-the-way' win at the 1971 Hardie Ferodo 500 at Bathurst. 1972 saw the "Supercar scare" which killed off the Phase 4 Falcon project. Ford was forced to use the Phase 3 GTHO again for its Bathurst campaign and in a race that started on a wet track the light-footed Holden LJ Torana GTR XU-1 driven by a young Peter Brock won the day. But Ford did add a major trophy to their cabinet by winning the 1972 Australian Manufacturers' Championship.

In 1973 the Ford team contested the Australian Touring Car Championship with Allan Moffat winning from Holden rival Brock. Moffat's car was however entered under the name Allan Moffat Racing. At Bathurst (now a 1,000 km race) Moffat and co-driver Ian Geoghegan won in a Falcon XA GT after early leader John Goss was involved in a collision and Doug Chivas famously ran the HDT car he shared with Brock out of petrol.

On 25 January 1974, the Ford Motor Company announced that they were ending factory involvement in motor racing, with the effects of the 1973 Oil Crisis being cited as one of the reasons for the company's withdrawal. The Australian Ford works team was wound up, with Moffat driving as a privateer in 1974 with sponsorship from Brut 33.

== Moffat Ford Dealers ==
In 1976 Ford supported the Moffat Ford Dealers Team, in the Australian Touring Car Championship and Bathurst 1000 with Allan Moffat. The team expanded to two cars in 1977 with Moffat and Colin Bond as drivers (after 8 years, Bond had left the Holden Dealer Team at the end of 1976 to join Moffat). Moffat and Bond finished 1-2 in both the Touring Car Championship before going on to a memorable 1-2 finish in the 1977 Hardie-Ferodo 1000 with multiple 24 Hours of Le Mans winner Jacky Ickx joining Moffat in victory. The #1 Falcon was limping at the finish of the race with no brakes after Ickx had been overly hard on them during his driving stint, but as the team owner Moffat had ordered that Bond not pass him to take the victory, orders which years later Bond regretted following.

It was to be the high point for the team who faced stiff opposition in 1978 from the Holden LX Torana SS A9X's which swept all before them with Peter Brock and the HDT winning the 1978 ATCC, the Sandown 400 and the Hardie-Ferodo 1000 (with Jim Richards). Ford introduced the Ford XC Falcon Cobra in late 1978, but even this could not halt the Holden/Brock onslaught. Ford withdrew its support for touring car racing at the end of 1978, with Moffat and Bond going their separate ways.

== 1978-1999 ==
After 1978, Ford withdrew all development and involvement in Australian motor racing. Various drivers however stuck to Ford products, and the XD and XE Falcons saw success in the 1981, 1982 and 1984 as well as the 1981 James Hardie 1000 with Dick Johnson at the wheel. Johnson also told that he never really had official help from Ford until the early days of the Group 3A 5.0L touring cars (the forerunner of V8 Supercars) which began in late 1992, although like most top Ford drivers he received support from Ford's auto parts brand Motorcraft. He told that in the days of the XD and XE Falcons, the only help he got from Ford was them allowing him to walk a car down their production line telling what could be left off for its racing purposes.

In order for the Falcon to still be eligible for racing though, a limited number of XD Falcon's were produced by Phase Autos, with aerodynamic improvements by Ford Australia designer Wayne Draper. Unfortunately when Draper made aerodynamic improvements on the XE model which included a small rear spoiler as well as a spoiler on the rear of the roof aimed at directing air down to the rear spoiler, they were largely derived by the touring car racers (especially Dick Johnson at the 1982 James Hardie 1000) as not having worked with Johnson claiming on live television during a Racecam talk on Channel 7 that they were as useful as an ashtray on a motorbike. It was later found that the real problem had been teams moving their suspension pickup points to be more inline with what they knew from the XD model and it was this and not Draper's aero improvements that was causing the newer Falcon's rear suspension to have far more travel than was desirable. However, by the time this was found to be the case, the larger ducktail type rear spoiler was already in widespread use on the big Ford's.

It wasn't until 1999 that Ford supported a proper factory outfit, purchasing Glenn Seton's team and renaming it Ford Tickford Racing. Seton, the son of former Ford Works driver Barry Seton, had been receiving financial support from Ford since the 1996 season with his Falcon's major sponsor being Ford Credit.

== Rallying ==
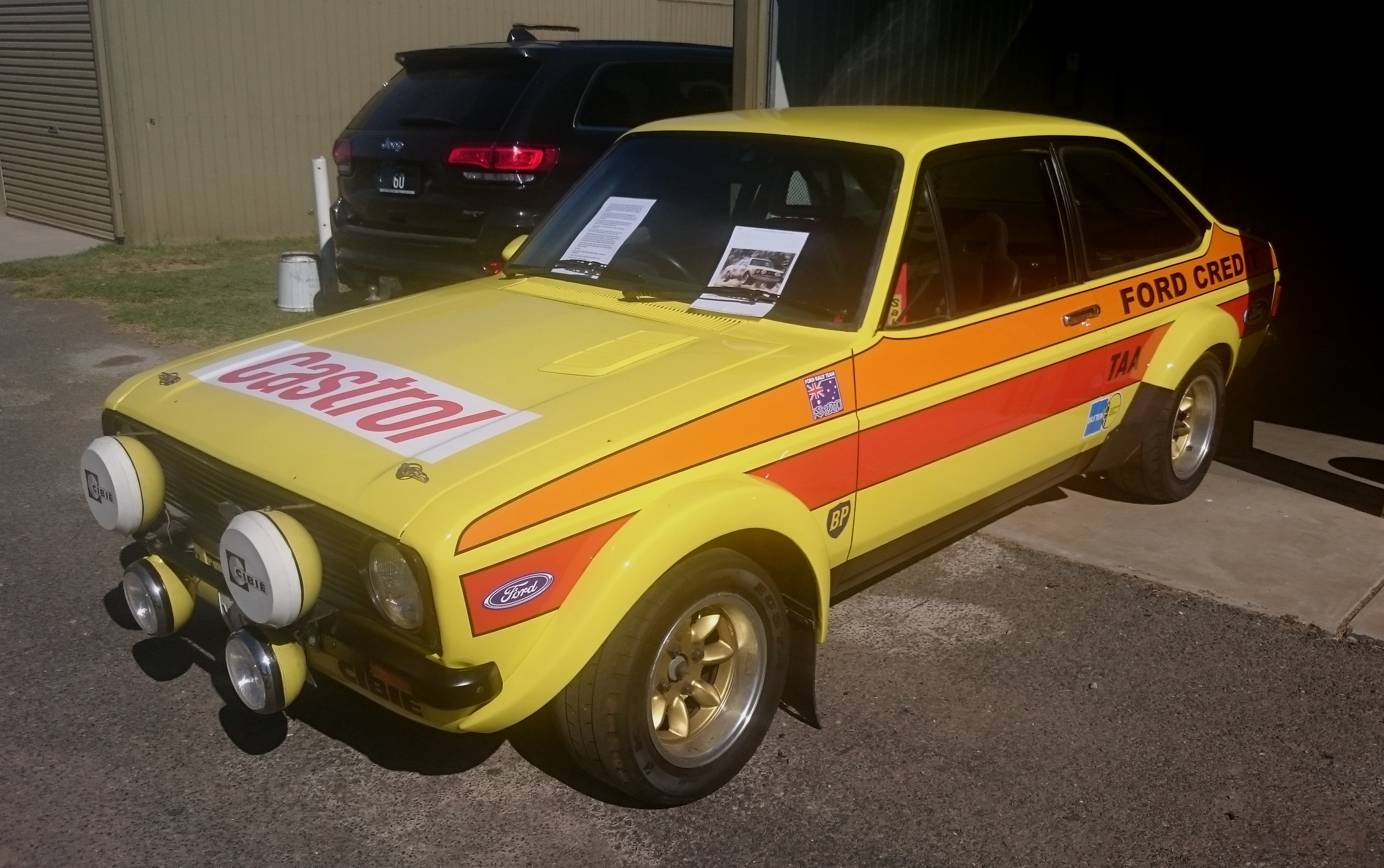
Colin Bond placed second in the 1980 Australian Rally Championship in this "works rally team" Ford Escort RS1800

In rallying, in 1977 a very competitive Ford works rally team was formed with 1971, 1972 and 1974 Australian Rally Champion Colin Bond as team manager and lead driver with future triple ARC champion Greg Carr as the other team driver. Carr won the 1978 Australian Rally Championship (his first) for Ford in a Ford Escort BDA. The team was wound up at the end of the 1980 season.

Ford also entered a three car Ford Cortina team in the 1979 Repco Reliability Trial which started and finished at the Royal Melbourne Showgrounds. Despite the late decision to enter the event, the Cortinas, led by Colin Bond, were quick but fragile with the example driven by Gregg Carr proving to be "the fastesty combination in the event". Carr eventually placed fifth. The 20,000 km rally (ran clockwise around the country over mostly dirt roads) was won by Peter Brock in a HDT prepared Holden VB Commodore. The HDT would in fact lock out the podium with a 1-2-3 finish.

== List of championships, series and major events won ==
1964 Lowood 4 Hour - Harry Firth & John Raeburn (Ford Cortina GT)
1964 Ampol Trial - Harry Firth & Graham Hoinville (Ford Cortina GT)
1966 Southern Cross Rally - Harry Firth & Graham Hoinville (Ford Cortina GT)
1968 Australian Rally Championship - Harry Firth & Graham Hoinville (Ford Cortina Lotus)
1969 Australian Rally Championship - Frank Kilfoyle & Doug Rutherford (Ford Cortina Lotus)
1970 Tasman Touring Series - Allan Moffat (Ford Falcon GTHO)
1970 Rothmans 250 Production Classic - Allan Moffat (Ford Falcon GTHO)
1972 Australian Manufacturers' Championship (Ford Falcon GTHO) (Note: Ford's championship points were scored by a car entered by McLeod Ford as well as by the Ford Motor Company entries)
1973 Australian Touring Car Championship - Allan Moffat (Ford Falcon GTHO). Moffat's car was entered under the name Allan Moffat Racing.
1978 Australian Rally Championship - Greg Carr & Fred Gocentas (Ford Escort RS1800)
1980 Castrol International Rally - Greg Carr & Fred Gocentas (Ford Escort RS 1800 Mark II)

- Note: This list does not include endurance race wins at Bathurst and Sandown. These are shown in the tables below

== Phillip Island - Bathurst 500/1000 Wins ==
Year	Class	No	Drivers	Chassis	Laps
Year	Class	No	Drivers	Engine	Laps
1962	B	21	(Australia) Harry Firth (Australia) Bob Jane	Ford XL Falcon	167
1962	B	21	(Australia) Harry Firth (Australia) Bob Jane	Ford Pursuit 170 2.8 L S6	167
1963	C	20	(Australia) Harry Firth (Australia) Bob Jane	Ford Cortina Mk.I GT	130
1963	C	20	(Australia) Harry Firth (Australia) Bob Jane	Ford Kent 1.5 L I4	130
1964	C	15	(Australia) Bob Jane (Australia) George Reynolds	Ford Cortina Mk.I GT	130
1964	C	15	(Australia) Bob Jane (Australia) George Reynolds	Ford Kent 1.5 L I4	130
1967	D	52	(Australia) Harry Firth (Australia) Fred Gibson	Ford XR Falcon GT	130
1967	D	52	(Australia) Harry Firth (Australia) Fred Gibson	Ford 289 4.7 L V8	130
1970	D	64	(Canada) Allan Moffat	Ford XW Falcon GTHO Phase II	130
1970	D	64	(Canada) Allan Moffat	Ford 351 5.8 L V8	130
1971	D	65	(Canada) Allan Moffat	Ford XY Falcon GT-HO Phase III	130
1971	D	65	(Canada) Allan Moffat	Ford 351 5.8 L V8	130
1973	D	9	(Canada) Allan Moffat (Australia) Ian Geoghegan	Ford XA Falcon GT Hardtop	163
1973	D	9	(Canada) Allan Moffat (Australia) Ian Geoghegan	Ford 351 5.8 L V8	163

== Sandown Endurance Wins ==
Year	Class	No	Drivers	Chassis	Laps
Year	Class	No	Drivers	Engine	Laps
1969	D	61	(Canada) Allan Moffat (Australia) John French	Ford XW Falcon GTHO Phase I	118
1969	D	61	(Canada) Allan Moffat (Australia) John French	Ford 351 5.8 L V8	118
1970	E	50	(Canada) Allan Moffat	Ford XW Falcon GTHO Phase II	130
1970	E	50	(Canada) Allan Moffat	Ford 351 5.8 L V8	130
