= Harry Firth =

Australian racing driver (1918–2014)

Harry Firth, OAM
- Nationality: Australian
- Born: Henry Leslie Firth; 18 April 1918 Orbost, Victoria, Australia
- Died: 27 April 2014 (aged 96) Melbourne, Victoria, Australia

Awards
- 2007: Supercars Hall of Fame

Henry Leslie Firth, OAM (18 April 1918 – 27 April 2014) was an Australian racing driver and team manager. Firth was a leading race and rally driver during the 1950s and 1960s and continued as an influential team manager with first the Ford works team and then the famed Holden Dealer Team (HDT) well into the 1970s. Firth’s nickname was "the fox", implying his use of cunning ploys as a team manager.

Firth won the Bathurst 500, including its predecessor at Phillip Island, four times (twice in the final two races held at the Island and twice at Bathurst). He also won the Southern Cross Rally and the Australian Rally Championship. He was inducted into the Supercars Hall of Fame in 2007.

Firth has often been described as a 'bush engineer', someone who could probably build a race winning engine from nothing more than a roll of wire, while leading Australian Motoring journalist and former part-time racer Bill Tuckey once wrote of Firth that as a driver, engineer and team manager, he was "As cunning as an outhouse rat".

Firth was awarded the Medal of the order of Australia on 26 January 1999 for services to Motor Racing as a driver, team manager and engineer. https://honours.pmc.gov.au/honours/awards/887108 On 27 April 2014, Firth died in his sleep surrounded by his family, he was aged 96.

== Early years ==
Firth was born in Orbost, Victoria. Firth enlisted in the Australian Army on 23 October 1939 and was assigned to the 1st Corps of Signals. He was discharged at the end of the war on 3 October 1945. https://nominal-rolls.dva.gov.au/veteran?id=421086&c=WW2 After returning from service in World War II, Firth turned his attention to motorsport. He was involved in preparing the winning BMW 328 for the 1948 Australian Grand Prix (driven by Frank Pratt). In the 1950s, Firth successfully competed in Porsche 356’s in races and hillclimbs. Firth had a great record in the Alpine Rally, winning the event five times between 1953 and 1962. Firth then teamed with Bob Jane in a Mercedes-Benz 220SE to win the 1961 Armstrong 500 at Philip Island.

== Ford works team ==
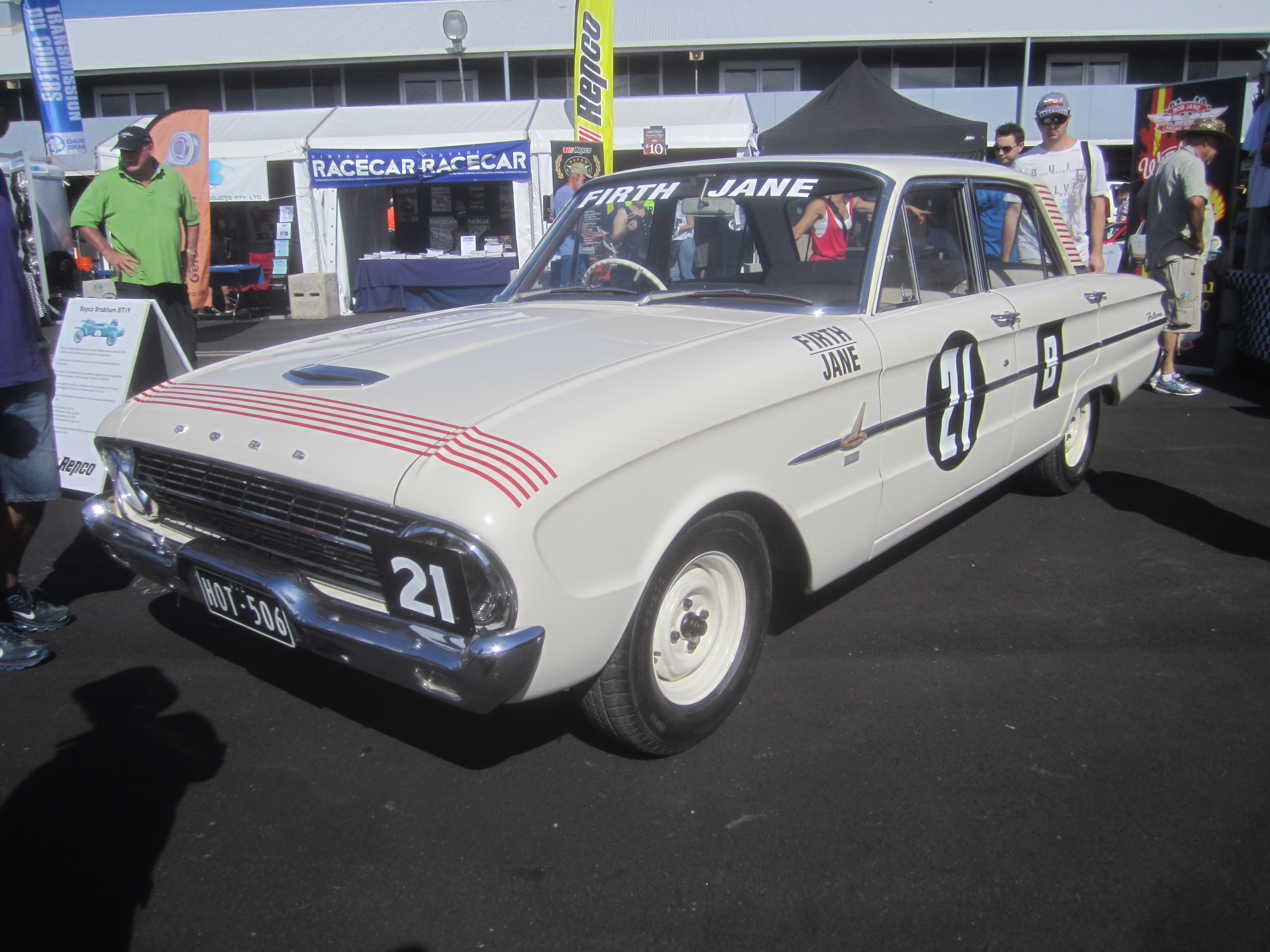
A Ford Falcon XL built up as a tribute to the car which was driven by Firth and Bob Jane to "First across the line" in the 1962 Armstrong 500

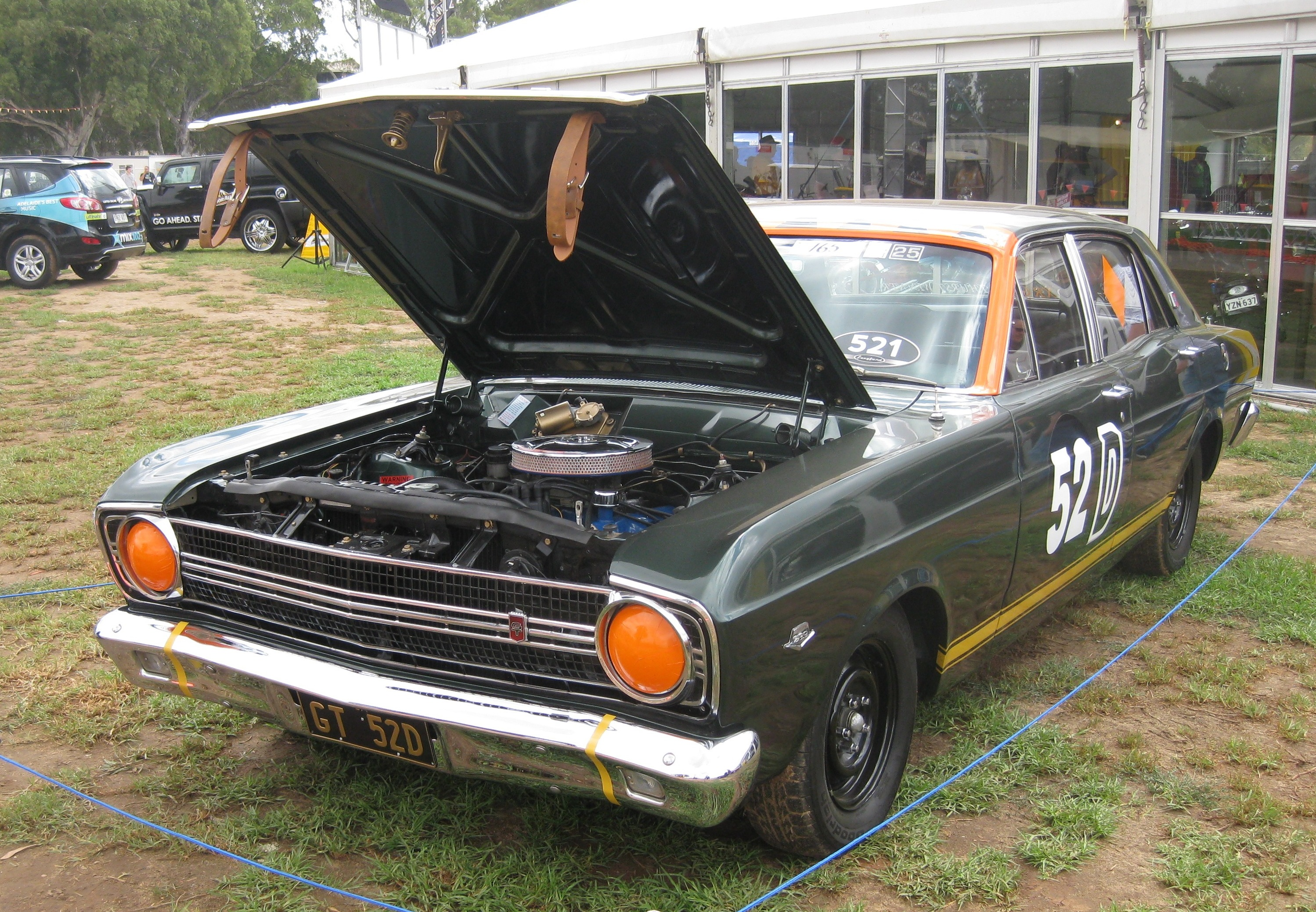
A "race replica" of the Ford XR Falcon GT driven to victory in the 1967 Gallaher 500 by Harry Firth and Fred Gibson

In 1962, the Firth Motors workshop at Queens Avenue, Auburn (Melbourne) became the base for the Ford works team. Firth and Jane drove a Ford Works Team Ford Falcon XL to victory in the 1962 Armstrong 500 at Philip Island. Firth and Jane recorded the races first hat-trick of wins when they won the 1963 Armstrong 500 driving a Mk.I Ford Cortina GT at Bathurst (the race had moved to Bathurst that year due to the poor state of the Phillip Island Circuit following the 1962 race). In 1964 Firth and Hoinville won the Ampol Round Australia Trial in a Cortina GT. Firth also won the 1964 Lowood 4 Hour with John Raeburn in a Ford Cortina GT.

Firth and John Reaburn finished third in the 1964 Armstrong 500 in a Cortina GT, while Bob Jane won his 4th in a row, teaming with George Reynolds, also in a GT. Firth and Reaburn also teamed in the 1965 Armstrong 500, but while the winning Ford Works car of Barry Seton and Midge Bosworth was the Harry Firth developed Ford Cortina GT500, Firth and Reaburn finished only 14th outright but won Class A for cars priced under £920 in a Mk.I Ford Cortina 220.

As part of his work with Ford Australia, Firth was recommended as a driver by a young Canadian born Aussie racing in the new Trans-Am series in the United States named Allan Moffat, and he traveled to the US and co-drove with Moffat in an Under-2 litre class Lotus Cortina in two races, a six-hour race at the Green Valley Raceway in Smithfield, Texas, and a four-hour race at Riverside in California. Following the Riverside race, the American's reportedly wanted Firth to stay and help the team but Firth refused, stating that he had to be back in Australia for a rally. Harry Firth won the rally in question, the inaugural Southern Cross Rally, with navigator Graham Hoinville, driving a Ford Cortina GT.

The Ford works team didn't enter any cars for the 1966 Gallaher 500 at Bathurst and Firth teamed with Ern Abbott in a Morris Cooper S to finish in 6th place. The first nine finishers in the race all drove the famed Cooper S.

1967 saw Firth notch up his last victory as a driver in the annual 500 mile race at Bathurst, winning the 1967 Gallaher 500 with a young Fred Gibson in a Ford XR Falcon GT, the first Australian made Ford Falcon to use a V8 engine. Sydney based racer/designer Frank Matich was scheduled to co-drive with Firth but had to withdraw due to other commitments. Firth wouldn't have minded so much on missing out on the driving talents of Frank Matich as he was always of the belief that drivers used to being able to drive their specially built race cars hard weren't well suited to Series Production racing where you had to be much easier on what was really a road going car. Matich then recommended Gibson (who had finished second in the 1966 race in a Cooper S) for the drive, with Firth meeting Gibson for the first time at a Bathurst hotel on the Friday before the race. Firth and Gibson were actually flagged in 2nd behind their Ford works team mates, Ian and Leo Geoghegan but following a re-count of the lap charts (after Firth protested the result resulting in long term animosity between himself and the Geoghegans), were correctly awarded 1st place later that night.

Firth won the 1968 Australian Rally Championship driving a Ford Cortina Lotus. That year he also led a three car Ford Australia assault on the inaugural London–Sydney Marathon, preparing a trio of XT Falcon GT's for the event which started on 24–25 November at Crystal Palace in London and traveled through Europe, the Middle East and South Asia before arriving in Bombay, India on 1–2 December. From there, the teams and their cars had an eight-day boat trip to Fremantle, Western Australia. The cars then traveled across the Nullarbor Plain into South Australia before finally crossing into New South Wales and arriving at the Warwick Farm Raceway in Sydney on 18 December. The Ford Works Team cars, which included Firth in the driving line up, survived the tough conditions of the marathon rally and finished third, sixth and eighth and claiming the Teams Prize.

== Holden Dealer Team ==
In 1969, Firth was considered by those at Ford to be 'too old' and was replaced as Ford Works Team boss by Al Turner, an American more known in Drag racing than circuit racing. Within a short time he had crossed over to General Motors Holden (GMH) to become manager of the new Holden Dealer Team, which despite the "Dealer" name (and Harry's claims on the ABC's Four Corners program in 1970 that as team boss he worked for a so-called "Dealer's Council") was actually a full works team backed by Holden and set up by GMH executive John Bagshaw. Because of General Motors worldwide factory ban on motorsport at the time (dating back to the 1955 24 Hours of Le Mans disaster that killed 80 people), the team's cash flow from Holden had to come through the 'back door' to avoid alerting GM headquarters in Detroit. Ironically, the HDT operated out of Firth’s Auburn workshop, the same that had once housed the Ford works team.

That year (1969), Firth was instrumental in launching the professional careers of two soon to be famous drivers – talented up and coming rally driver Colin Bond and young tearaway Peter Brock whose feats in an Austin A30 had brought him to Firth’s attention. Bond and Tony Roberts won the 1969 Bathurst 500 for the HDT in a Holden Monaro GTS350, with Des West and Brock finishing third in a similar car.

Over the next eight years the Holden Dealer Team under Firth achieved many notable race and rally victories and championship wins. Included among these are:

- 1970 Southern Cross Rally - Barry Ferguson / Dave Johnson in a Holden LC Torana GTR XU-1.
- 1971 South Pacific Touring Series - Colin Bond in an LC Torana GTR XU-1.
- 1971 Southern Cross Rally - Colin Bond / George Shepheard in an LC Torana GTR XU-1.
- 1971, 1972, 1973 and 1974 Australian Rally Championship wins by Colin Bond in an LC Torana GTR XU-1 (`71) and a Holden LJ Torana GTR XU-1 (`72 & `74) and Peter Lang (LJ Torana in '73).
- 1971 Autolite Rallycross series - Peter Brock in an LC Torana GTR XU-1 nicknamed "The Beast".
- 1971 Sandown 250 - Colin Bond in an LC Torana GTR XU-1.
- 1972, 1973 and 1974 Sun-7 Chesterfield Series - Colin Bond in an LJ Torana GTR XU-1 (`72 and `73) and the new, V8 Torana SL/R 5000 (`74).
- 1972 Toby Lee Series - Colin Bond in an LJ Torana GTR XU-1.
- 1972 Bathurst 500 with Peter Brock driving an LJ Torana GTR XU-1. It was the first of Brock's record 9 wins in the Bathurst 500 / 1000.
- 1973 and 1974 South Pacific Touring Series - Peter Brock in an LJ Torana GTR XU-1.
- 1973 Sandown 250 - Peter Brock in an LJ Torana GTR XU-1.
- 1974 Australian Touring Car Championship - Peter Brock driving both an XU-1 Torana and the new Torana SL/R 5000.
- 1975 Australian Touring Car Championship - Colin Bond driving an L34 Torana V8.
- Holden Dealer Team drivers secured the Australian Manufacturers' Championship for GMH in 1971, 1973 and 1974 using the LC Torana GTR XU-1 (`71), the LJ Torana GTR XU-1 (`73), and the LH Torana SL/R 5000 (`74).

At the end of 1977, Firth retired as manager of the Holden team but continued his involvement in motor racing as National Chief Scrutineer between 1978-1981.

== Career results ==
Season	Title	Position	Car	Entrant
1963	Australian Touring Car Championship	4th	Ford Cortina GT Mk.I	Ford Motor Co
1964	Australian Touring Car Championship	10th	Ford Cortina GT Mk.I	Ford Motor Co
1968	Australian Rally Championship	1st	Ford Cortina Lotus	

=== Complete Phillip Island/Bathurst 500 results ===
1961-62 were run at Phillip Island. The race moved to Bathurst in 1963.

Year	Team	Co-drivers	Car	Class	Laps	Pos.	Class pos.
1960	Rootes Australia	(Australia) John Reaburn	Singer Gazelle	C	159	13th	7th
1961	(Australia) Autoland Pty Ltd	(Australia) Bob Jane	Mercedes-Benz 220SE	B	167	1st	1st
1962	(Australia) Ford Motor Company	(Australia) Bob Jane	Ford Falcon XL	B	167	1st	1st
1963	Ford Australia	(Australia) Bob Jane	Ford Cortina Mk.I GT	C	130	1st	1st
1964	(Australia) Ford Motor Co	(Australia) John Reaburn	Ford Cortina Mk.I GT	C	129	3rd	3rd
1965	(Australia) Ford Motor Co	(Australia) John Reaburn	Ford Cortina Mk.I 220	A	119	14th	1st
1966	(Australia) Dents Motors	(Australia) Ern Abbott	Morris Cooper S	C	128	6th	6th
1967	Ford Australia	(Australia) Fred Gibson	Ford XR Falcon GT	D	130	1st	1st

Sporting positions
Preceded by John Roxburgh; Frank Coad	Winner of the Phillip Island / Bathurst 500; 1961, 1962 & 1963 (with Bob Jane)	Succeeded by Bob Jane; George Reynolds
Preceded by Bob Holden; Rauno Aaltonen	Winner of the Bathurst 500; 1967 (with Fred Gibson)	Succeeded by Bruce McPhee; Barry Mulholland
Preceded by Inaugural	Winner of the Australian Rally Championship; 1968	Succeeded by Frank Kilfoyle
