= 1969 Australian Rally Championship =

Seasons
- ← 1968 1970 →

The 1969 Australian Rally Championship was a series of five rallying events held across Australia during 1969. It was the second Australian Rally Championship.

Frank Kilfoyle won the Drivers Championship in a Ford Cortina Lotus and his navigator Doug Rutherford won the Navigators Championship. Ford won the Manufacturers Award.

== Season review ==
The second Australian Rally Championship was decided over five events, staged across the Eastern States of Australia with two events in Victoria and one each in Queensland, New South Wales and South Australia.

== The Rallies ==
The five events of the 1969 season were as follows.

Round	Rally	Date
1	Classic Rally (VIC)	
2	Snowy Mountains Rally (NSW)	
3	John Martin 500 (SA)	
4	Warana Rally (QLD)	
5	Alpine Rally (VIC)	

=== Round Two – Snowy Mountains Rally ===
Position	Driver	Navigator	Car	Points
1	Evan Green	Roy Denny	Austin 1800	153
2=	John Keran	Peter Meyer	Volvo 142S	173
2=	Colin Bond	Brian Hope	Mitsubishi Colt SS	173
4	Ian Vaughan	Bob Forsyth	Lotus Cortina	180
5	Bruce Collier	Steve Halloran	Renault R8 Gordini	243
6	Richard Harris	John Bryson	Mazda 1200 Coupe	285

=== Round Three – John Martin 500 Rally ===
Position	Driver	Navigator	Car	Points
1	Adrian Callary	Garry Chapman	Renault 16TS	49
2	Ron Waite	Peter McArthur	Toyota 1600S	122
2	Bob Watson	Jim McCaulliffe	Renault 16TS	153
4	John Keran	Peter Meyer	Repco Volvo 144S	293
5	Mal McPherson	Robin Sharpley	Renault 16TS	326
6	Garrie Bain	Adrian van Loon	Morris Cooper	392

== 1969 Drivers and Navigators Championships ==
Final pointscore for 1969 is as follows.

=== Frank Kilfoyle – Champion Driver 1969 ===
Position	Driver	Car	Points
1	Frank Kilfoyle	Ford Cortina Lotus	
2	John Keran	Volvo 142S	
3	Tony Roberts		
4	Ian Vaughan	Lotus Cortina	
5	Evan Green	Austin 1800	
6	Adrian Callary		

=== Doug Rutherford – Champion Navigator 1969 ===
Position	Navigator	Car	Points
1	Doug Rutherford	Ford Cortina Lotus	
2	Peter Meyer	Volvo 142S	
3	Brian Hope		
4	Bob Forsyth	Lotus Cortina	
5	Roy Denny	Austin 1800	
6	Garry Chapman		

== Manufacturers Award ==
Ford won the Manufacturers Award.
