= 1968 Australian Rally Championship =

Seasons
- ← none 1969 →

The 1968 Australian Rally Championship was a series of six rallying events held across Australia. It was the inaugural Australian Rally Championship.

Harry Firth and navigator Graham Hoinville won the Champion Driver and Champion Navigator titles respectively with a Ford Cortina Lotus.

== Season review ==
The first Australian Rally Championship was decided over six events, staged across the Eastern States of Australia with two events in Victoria and one each in Queensland, New South Wales, Australian Capital Territory and South Australia.

== The Rallies ==
The six events of the 1968 season were as follows.

Round	Rally	Date
1	Classic Rally (VIC)	
2	Snowy Mountains Rally (NSW)	
3	Walkerville 500 (SA)	
4	Canberra 500 (ACT)	
5	Warana Rally (QLD)	21/22 September 1968
6	Alpine Rally (VIC)	

=== Round Two – Snowy Mountains Rally ===
Position	Driver	Navigator	Car	Points
1	Barry Ferguson	Dave Johnson	Volkswagen Beetle	85
2	Greg Garard	Nigel Collier	Holden 186S	95
3	John Garard	Brian Waldron	Holden 186S	99
4	Bruce Collier	Steve Halloran	Renault R8 Gordini	102
5	Colin Bond	Brian Hope	Mitsubishi Colt Fastback	120
6	Bob Watson	Jim McCauliffe	Holden Kingswood HK	122

=== Round Five – Ampol Warana Car Rally ===
Position	Driver	Navigator	Car	Points
1=	Harry Firth	Graham Hoinville	Ford Cortina Lotus	
1=	Frank Kilfoyle	Doug Rutherford	Ford Cortina GT	
3	John Keran	Peter Meyer	Volvo 142S	99

== 1968 Drivers and Navigators Championships ==
Final pointscore for 1968 is as follows.

=== Harry Firth – Champion Driver 1968 ===
Position	Driver	Car	Points
1	Harry Firth	Ford Cortina Lotus	
2	Frank Kilfoyle	Ford Cortina GT	
3	John Keran	Volvo 142S	
4	Bob Watson	Holden Kingswood HK	
5	Ian Vaughan	Ford Cortina GT	
6	Barry Ferguson	Volkswagen Beetle	

=== Graham Hoinville – Champion Navigator 1968 ===
Position	Navigator	Car	Points
1	Graham Hoinville	Ford Cortina Lotus	
2	Peter Meyer	Volvo 142S	
