= 1964 Lowood 4 Hour =

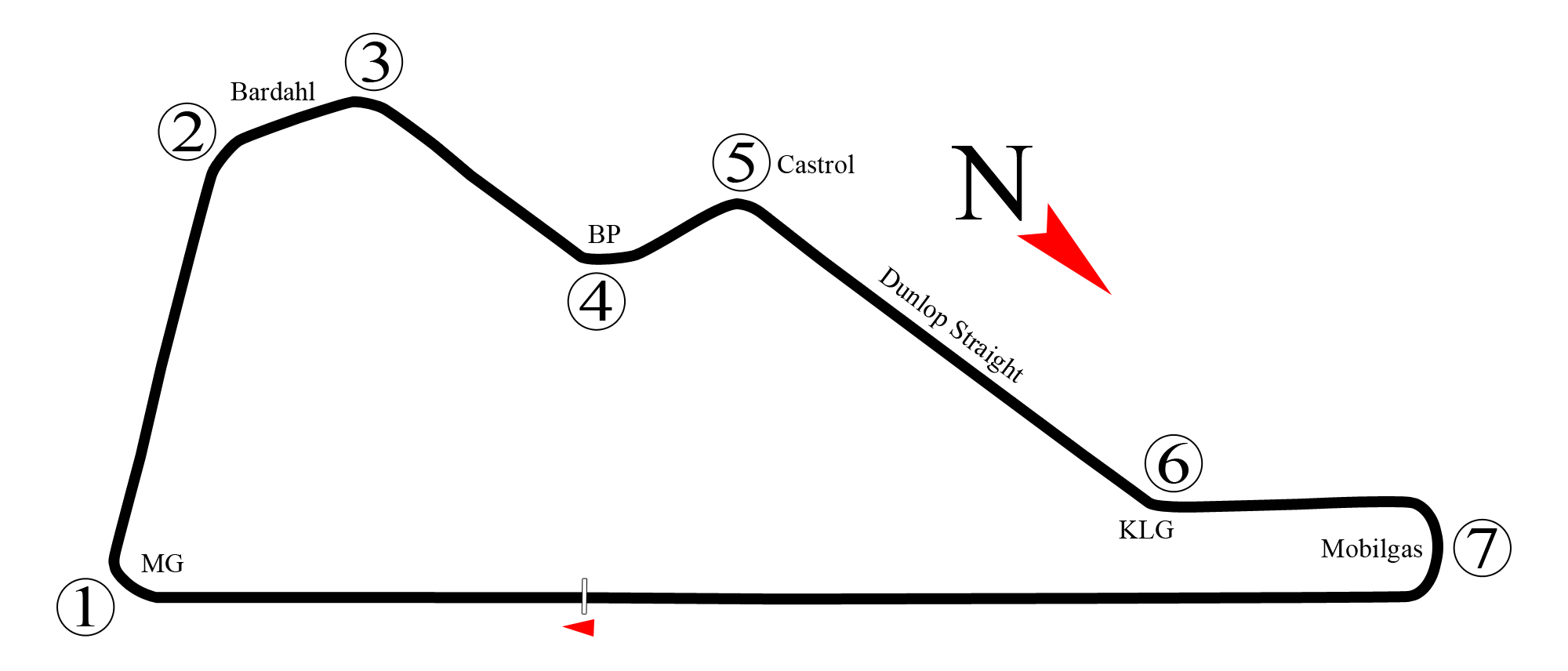
Layout of the Lowood Airfield Circuit (1946-1966)

The 1964 Lowood 4 Hour was a motor race for production touring cars staged at the Lowood circuit in Queensland, Australia on 12 April 1964. The race, which was promoted by the Queensland Racing Drivers' Club Ltd., was the first of three Lowood 4 Hour races to be held at the circuit.

Whilst the emphasis was on class results, the Ford Cortina GT driven by Harry Firth and John Raeburn had completed the greatest number of laps at the end of the four hours. This same car, driven by Harry Firth and Bob Jane, had won the 1963 Armstrong 500 endurance race at Bathurst six months before and was using the same set of tyres that had been on the car during its earlier victory.

== Classes ==
Cars competed in four classes grouped according to the retail selling price of each car.

- Class A : Up to £900
- Class B : £901 to £1,000
- Class C : £1,001 to £1,200
- Class D : £1,201 to £2,000

== Results ==
Position	Drivers	No.	Car	Entrant	Laps
	Class A (Up to £900)				
1	Lionel Ayers, Denis Geary	11	Hillman Imp	Stradbroke Motors	87
2	Bruce Neville, Brian Tebble		Morris 850	B.J. Neville	87
3	Gordon Ferrar, Roy Sawyer	15	Morris 850	Downshift Racing Team	83
4	Geoff Sakzewski, Errol Sakzewski		Volkswagen	Adams Form Pty Ltd	81
	Class B (£901 to £1000)				
1	Max Volkers, Glynn Scott		Ford Cortina 1500	Ford Motor Company	96
2	Ken Peters, K. Shaw		Morris Cooper	Downshift Racing Team	95
3	W. Bailey, Viv Eddy		Morris Cooper	W. Bailey	94
4	B. Fleming, G. Symons	26	Renault R8	G.P. Cars	93
5	B. Tapsall, D. White		Renault R8		92
6	J. Bertram, Bill Gates		Renault R8		85
DNF	Ron Hodgson, John French		Morris Cooper	Peter Uscinski Pty Ltd	69
DNF	D. Gear, D. Barrett	27	Morris Cooper		42
	Class C (£1001 to £1200)				
1	Harry Firth, John Raeburn	30	Ford Cortina GT	Ford Motor Company	100
2	G. Perry, B. Flynn		Ford Cortina GT	M. Volkers	94
	Class D (£1201 to £2000)				
1	Spencer Martin, Bill Brown	43	Fiat 2300	Scuderia Veloce	97
2	Bill Burns, Brian Lawler		Fiat 2300	W. Burns	97
3	G. Ward, B. McPhee	41	Volvo B18	G. Ward	95
4	Sib Petralia, John Gillmeister	45	Fiat 2300	Europa Motors	94
5	G. Griffith, G. Perrin		Humber Vogue Sports		92
DNF	Fulla, Vine	42	Vauxhall VX4/90	Clive Nolan Motors	

== Notes ==
- Of the 20 cars which started the race, 17 finished and three retired.
- The Butler Car Electrics Trophy for the first Queensland entrant was awarded to the Downshift Racing Team (Morris Cooper).
