= 1980 Castrol International Rally =

- Host country: Australia
- Rally base: Canberra
- Dates run: 22 – 23 March 1980
- Stages: 43
- Stage surface: Tarmac and Gravel
- Overall distance: 600 km (370 miles)

Statistics
- Crews: 50 at start, 33 at finish

Overall results
- Overall winner: Greg Carr; Fred Gocentas; Ford Motor Company of Australia

The 1980 Castrol International Rally was the seventh running of the Castrol International Rally. The rally took place between the 22nd and the 23rd of March 1980. The event was based in Canberra and covered 600 kilometres in 43 Special Stages. It was won by Greg Carr and Fred Gocentas, driving a Ford Escort RS 1800 Mark II.

== Results ==
| Pos | No | Entrant | Drivers | Car | Overall Time |
|---|---|---|---|---|---|
| 1 | 2 | Ford Motor Company of Australia | (Australia) Greg Carr (Australia) Fred Gocentas | Ford Escort RS 1800 Mark II | 3hr 58min 17sec |
| 2 | 1 | (New Zealand) Masport NZ Limited | (Finland) Ari Vatanen (United Kingdom) David Richards | Ford Escort RS 1800 Mark II | 3hr 58min 57sec |
| 3 | 4 | Ford Motor Company of Australia | (Australia) Colin Bond (Australia) John Dawson-Damer | Ford Escort RS 1800 Mark II | 4hr 5min 5sec |
| 4 | 9 | (Australia) Pedders Shock Absorber Service | (Australia) Hugh Bell (Australia) Damian O'Reilly | Datsun 1600 | 4hr 18min 23sec |
| 5 | 05 | (Australia) Marlboro Holden Dealer Team | (Australia) Peter Brock (Australia) Noel Richards | Holden Commodore VB | 4hr 21min 0sec |
| 6 | 20 | (Australia) Chris Gabriel | (Australia) Chris Gabriel (Australia) Yvette Polonyi | Mitsubishi Galant | 4hr 23min 6sec |
| 7 | 6 | (Australia) Team Castrol Gemini | (Australia) Wayne Bell (Australia) David Boddy | Holden Gemini PF60 | 4hr 25min 1sec |
| 8 | 3 | (New Zealand) Masport NZ Limited | (New Zealand) Jim Donald (New Zealand) Kevin Lancaster | Ford Escort RS 1800 Mark II | 4hr 28min 22sec |
| 9 | 15 | (Australia) Redcliffe Steering | (Australia) Murray Coote (Australia) Brian Marsden | Ford Escort RS 2000 Mark II | 4hr 29min 13sec |
| 10 | 32 | (Australia) Gosford Dyno Tune Centre | (Australia) Michael Bell (Australia) Richard Davis | Ford Escort RS 2000 Mark II | 4hr 30min 35sec |
| 11 | 13 | (Australia) Team Castrol Gemini | (Australia) Barry Ferguson (Australia) Steve Owens | Holden Gemini PF60 | 4hr 30min 52sec |
| 12 | 48 | (Australia) David House | (Australia) David House (Australia) Ron Page | Datsun 1600 | 4hr 31min 28sec |
| 13 | 28 | (Australia) Race and Rally Sales P/L | (Australia) Gordon Leven (Australia) Robert Wilson | Datsun 510 SSS | 4hr 33min 3sec |
| 14 | 11 | (Australia) Opposite Lock | (Australia) Clive Slater (Australia) Ann Heaney | Ford Escort RS 2000 Mark II | 4hr 33min 51sec |
| 15 | 40 | (Australia) Steve Stewart | (Australia) Steve Stewart (Australia) Bob Vince | Holden Torana LJ XU-1 | 4hr 33min 53sec |
| 16 | 47 | (Australia) John Fraser | (Australia) John Fraser (Australia) Ewan Higgins | Mitsubishi Lancer | 4hr 34min 58sec |
| 17 | 46 | (Australia) Trevor Vince | (Australia) Trevor Vince (Australia) Graeme Pigram | Datsun H510 | 4hr 37min 21sec |
| 18 | 39 | (Australia) Graeme Whatman | (Australia) Graeme Whatman (Australia) Jim Whatman | Mitsubishi Galant | 4hr 37min 35sec |
| 19 | 41 | (Australia) Road and Rally Centre | (Australia) Barrie Smith (Australia) Jan Mosher | Datsun 1600 | 4hr 37min 55sec |
| 20 | 21 | (Australia) Stephen Abigail | (Australia) Gary Bevan (Australia) Al Mearns | Datsun 1600 | 4hr 39min 1sec |
| 21 | 38 | (Australia) Gosford Dyno Tune Centre | (Australia) Dale Loader (Australia) Brian Cox | Mitsubishi Lancer | 4hr 40min 28sec |
| 22 | 31 | (Australia) Barry Lowe | (Australia) Barry Lowe (Australia) Kevin Atwood | Datsun 1600 | 4hr 40min 43sec |
| 23 | 43 | (Australia) Paul Cole | (Australia) Paul Cole (Australia) Russ Whitty | Datsun 1600 | 4hr 41min 25sec |
| 24 | 36 | (Australia) Apex Batteries Pty Ltd | (Australia) Gary Meehan (Australia) Greg Gifford | Toyota Celica RA40 | 4hr 41min 40sec |
| 25 | 14 | (Australia) Bob Watson Service Centre | (Australia) Bob Watson (Australia) Wayne Gregson | Peugeot 504 | 4hr 42min 38sec |
| 26 | 25 | (Australia) John Graydon | (Australia) John Graydon (Australia) Jeff Sullivan | Datsun 120Y | 4hr 43min 23sec |
| 27 | 33 | Citizen Watches Australia | (Australia) Peter Nelson (Australia) Grahame Moule | Datsun 1600 | 4hr 44min 53sec |
| 28 | 17 | (Australia) Col Parry | (Australia) Doug Stewart (Australia) Col Parry | Holden Commodore VB | 4hr 48min 3sec |
| 29 | 24 | (Australia) Road and Rally Centre | (Australia) Neil Weston (Australia) Peter Berriman | Datsun 1600 | 4hr 48min 35sec |
| 30 | 42 | (Australia) Keith Byrn | (Australia) Keith Byrn (Australia) Ken Smith | Mitsubishi Lancer | 4hr 49min 5sec |
| 31 | 22 | (Australia) Gary Mecak | (Australia) Gary Mecak (Australia) Pat Taylor | Mazda RX-2 | 4hr 51min 12sec |
| 32 | 19 | (Australia) Bruce Hodgson | (Australia) Bruce Hodgson (Australia) Mike Mitchell | Ford Falcon XA | 4hr 55min 44sec |
| 33 | 34 | (Australia) Danny Scorpecci | (Australia) Danny Scorpecci (Australia) Dick Bowman | Datsun 1600 | 5hr 0min 43sec |
