= Ford Falcon (XL) =

Australian full-size car

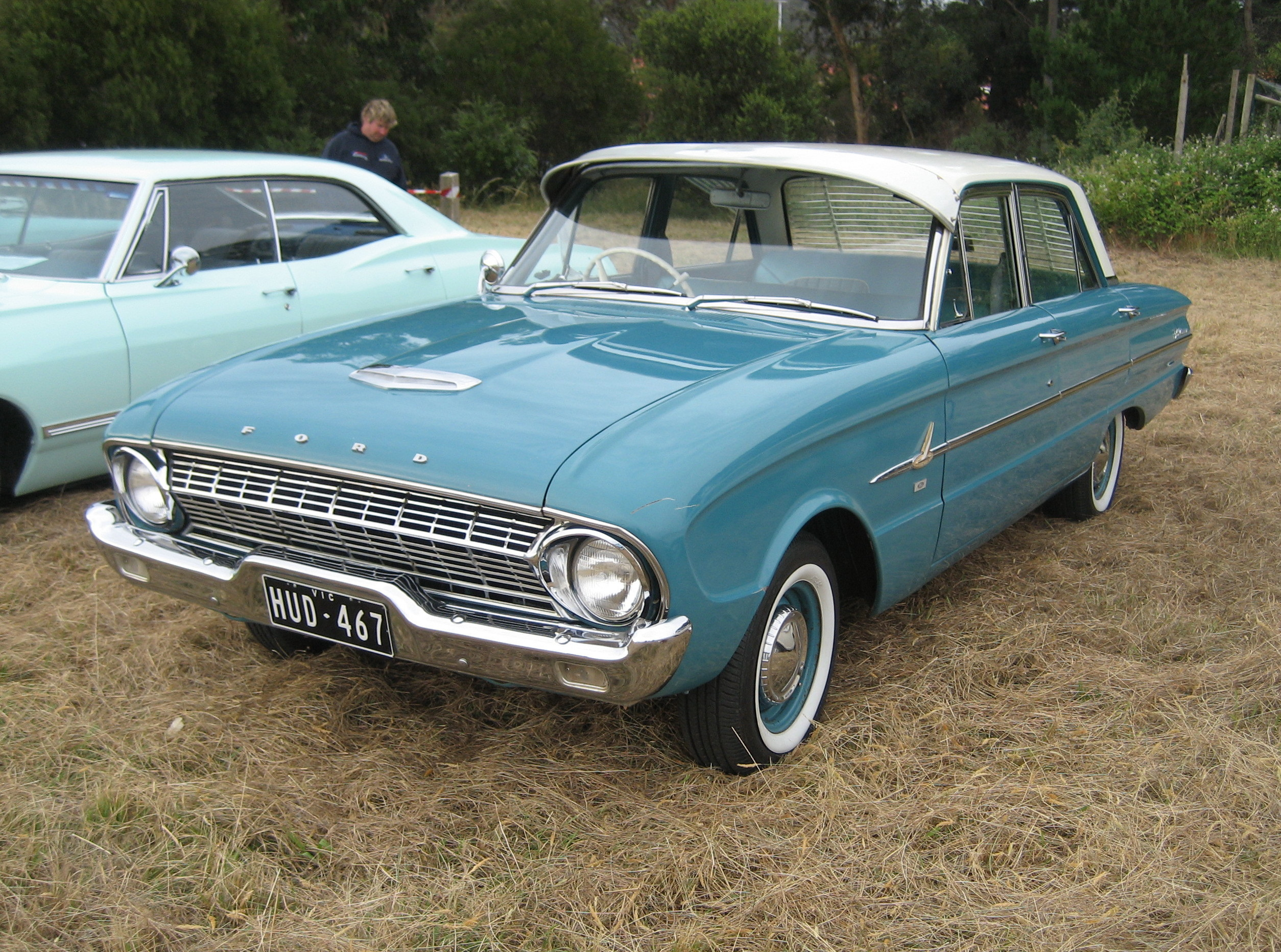
- Ford Falcon Deluxe Sedan (XL)

Overview
- Manufacturer: Ford Australia
- Production: August 1962 – February 1964

Body and chassis
- Class: Mid-size car
- Body style: 4-door sedan 4-door station wagon 2-door coupé utility 2-door panel van
- Layout: FR layout

Powertrain
- Engine: 2.4 L (144 cu in) Falcon Six I6; 2.8 L (170 cu in) Falcon Six I6
- Transmission: 3-speed manual 2-speed Fordomatic automatic

Dimensions
- Wheelbase: 2,781 mm (109.5 in)
- Length: 4,602 mm (181.2 in)
- Width: 1,778 mm (70.0 in)
- Height: 1,384 mm (54.5 in)
- Kerb weight: 1,106–1,135 kg (2,438–2,502 lb)

Chronology
- Predecessor: Ford Falcon (XK)
- Successor: Ford Falcon (XM)

The Ford Falcon (XL) is a mid-size car which was produced by Ford Australia from 1962 to 1964. It was the second iteration of the first generation of the Falcon

== Overview ==
The Falcon XL was introduced in August 1962, replacing the Falcon XK which had been in production since 1960. Visual changes from the XK included a new convex grille, bumper mounted park/turn lights, new taillights, and a revised, squared off roofline (on the sedans) which was promoted as the “Thunderbird roofline”. Other changes included a new manual gearbox (although it was still a three-speed unit), new clutch, new starter motor, new air cleaner, new suspension system and a new carburettor.

Both of the engines from the XK were retained; a 144 cu in (2,360 cc) Falcon Six inline-six, which produced 67 kW (90 hp; 91 PS) and an optional 170 cu in (2,786 cc) version of the Falcon Six, which produced 75 kW (101 hp; 102 PS). Pricing started at £1,070 ($2,140 AUD) for a base model Falcon.

== Model range ==
The Falcon XL range included four-door sedan and five-door station wagons. The luxury Futura Sedan and Squire Wagon models were new for the XL series, the latter featuring simulated woodgrain side and rear panels. Commercial vehicle derivatives were available in two-door coupe utility and two-door panel van body styles with the latter marketed as the Falcon Sedan Delivery.

Models were marketed as follows:

- Falcon Sedan
- Falcon Deluxe Sedan
- Falcon Futura Sedan
- Falcon Station Wagon
- Falcon Deluxe Wagon
- Falcon Squire Wagon
- Falcon Utility
- Falcon Deluxe Utility
- Falcon Sedan Delivery
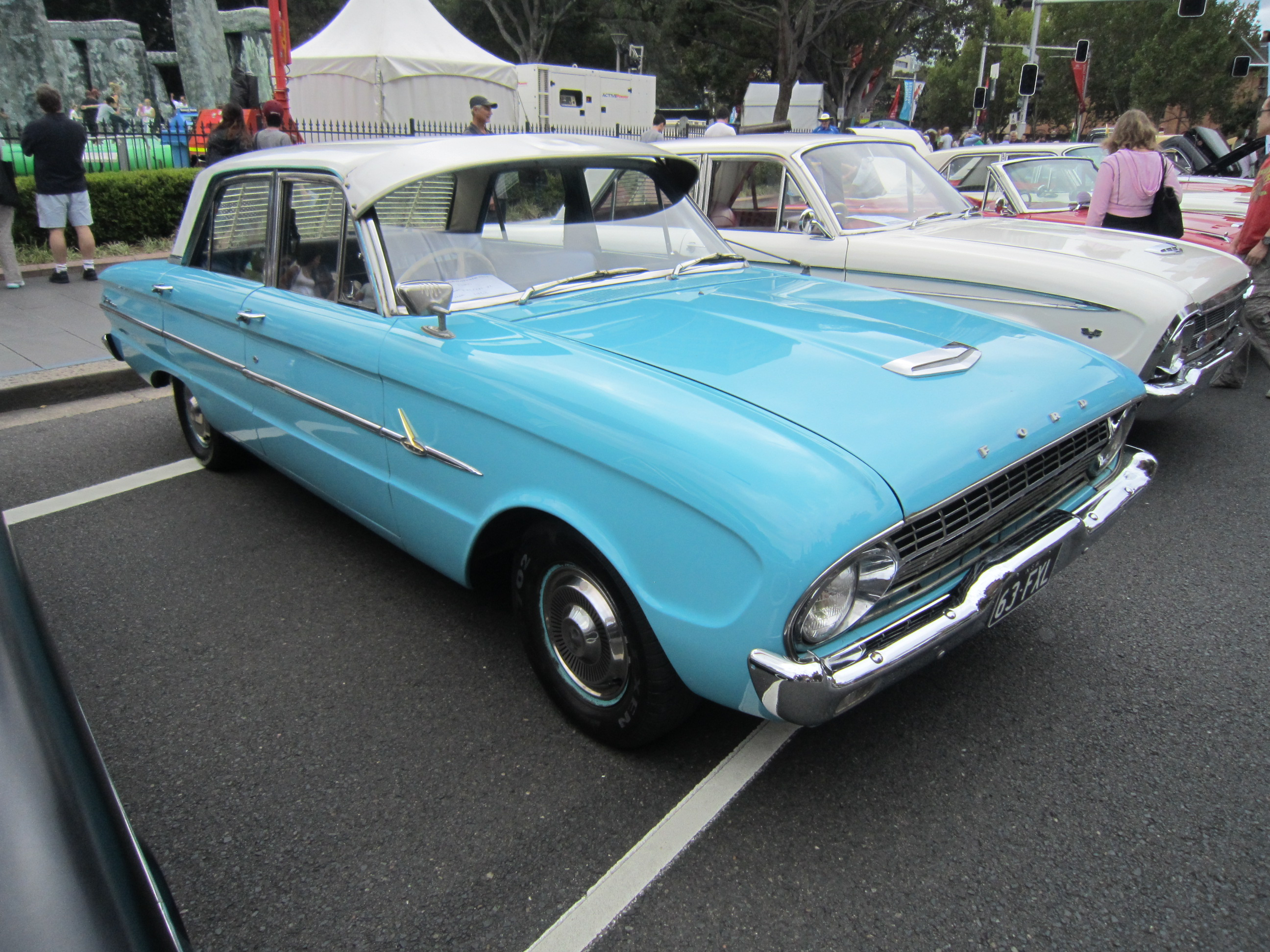
Ford XL Falcon Deluxe sedan

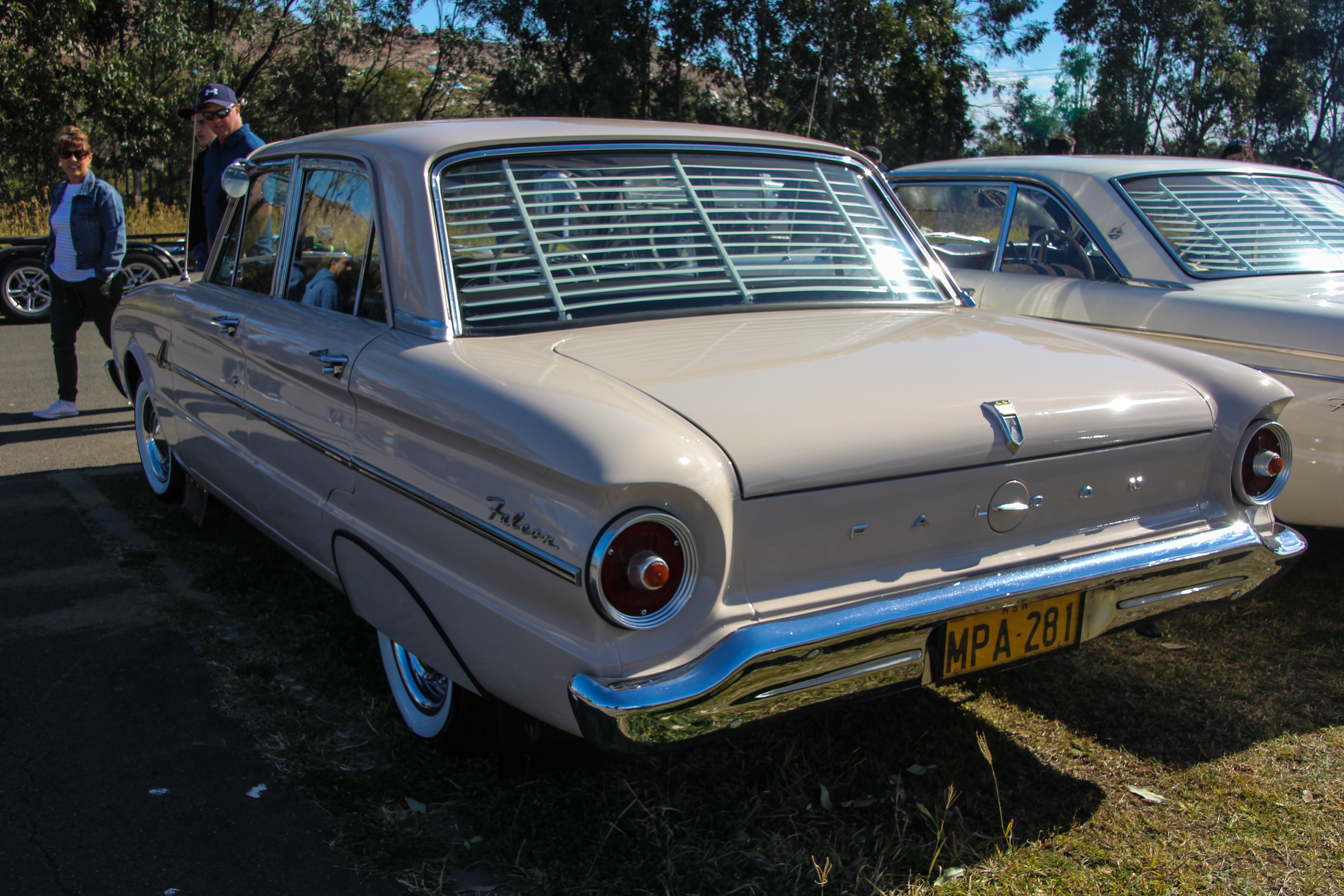
Ford XL Falcon Deluxe sedan

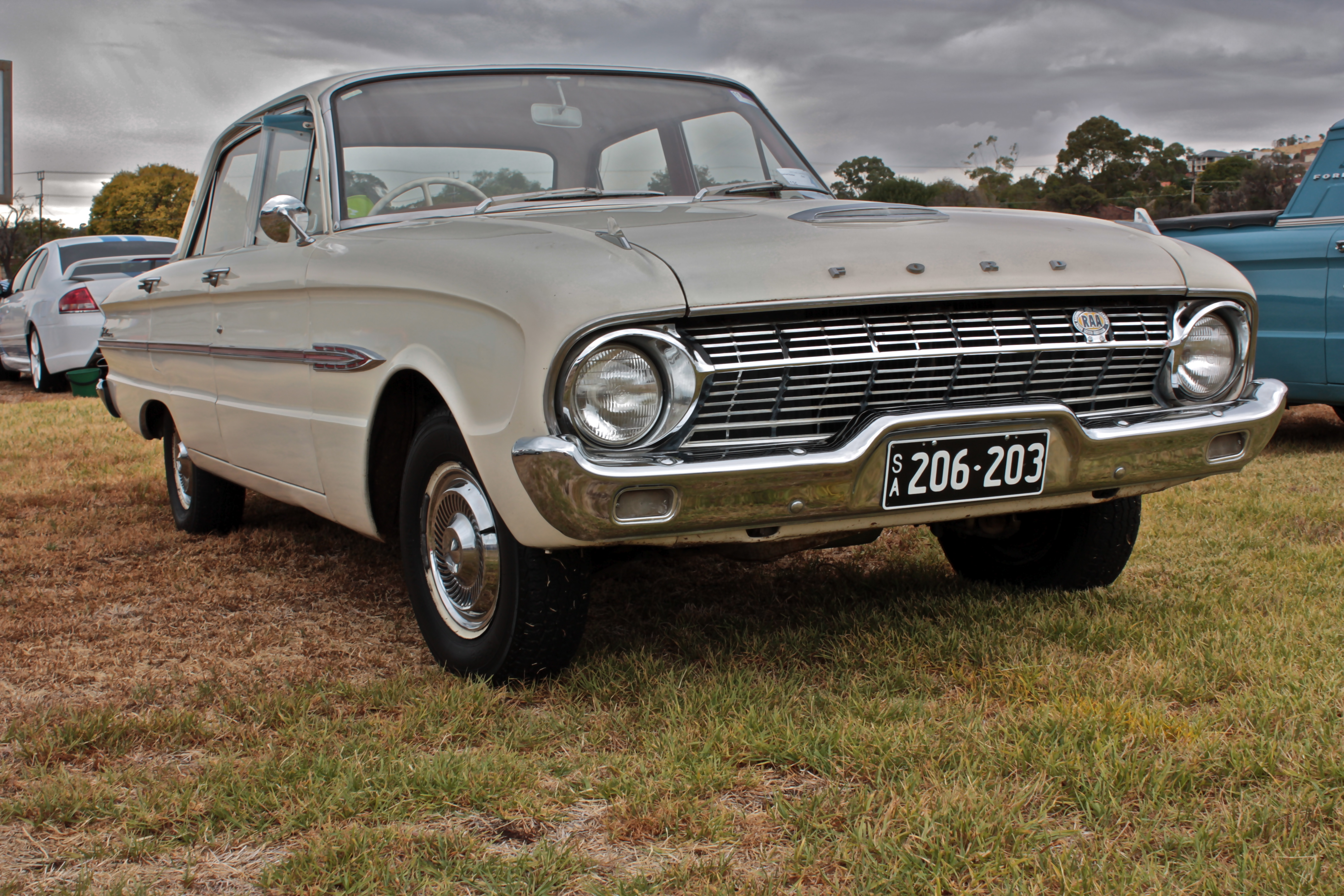
Ford XL Falcon Futura sedan

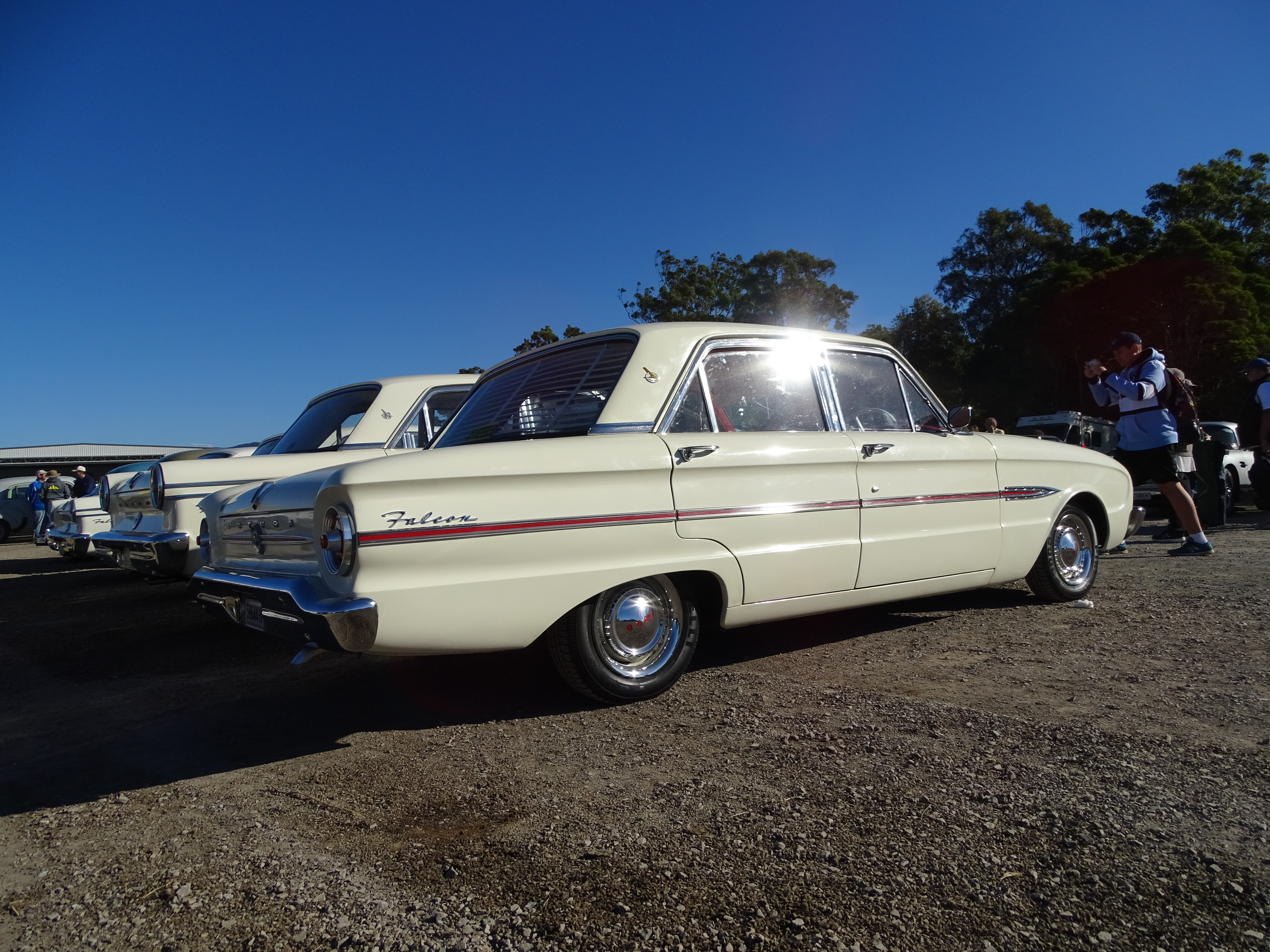
Ford XL Falcon Futura sedan

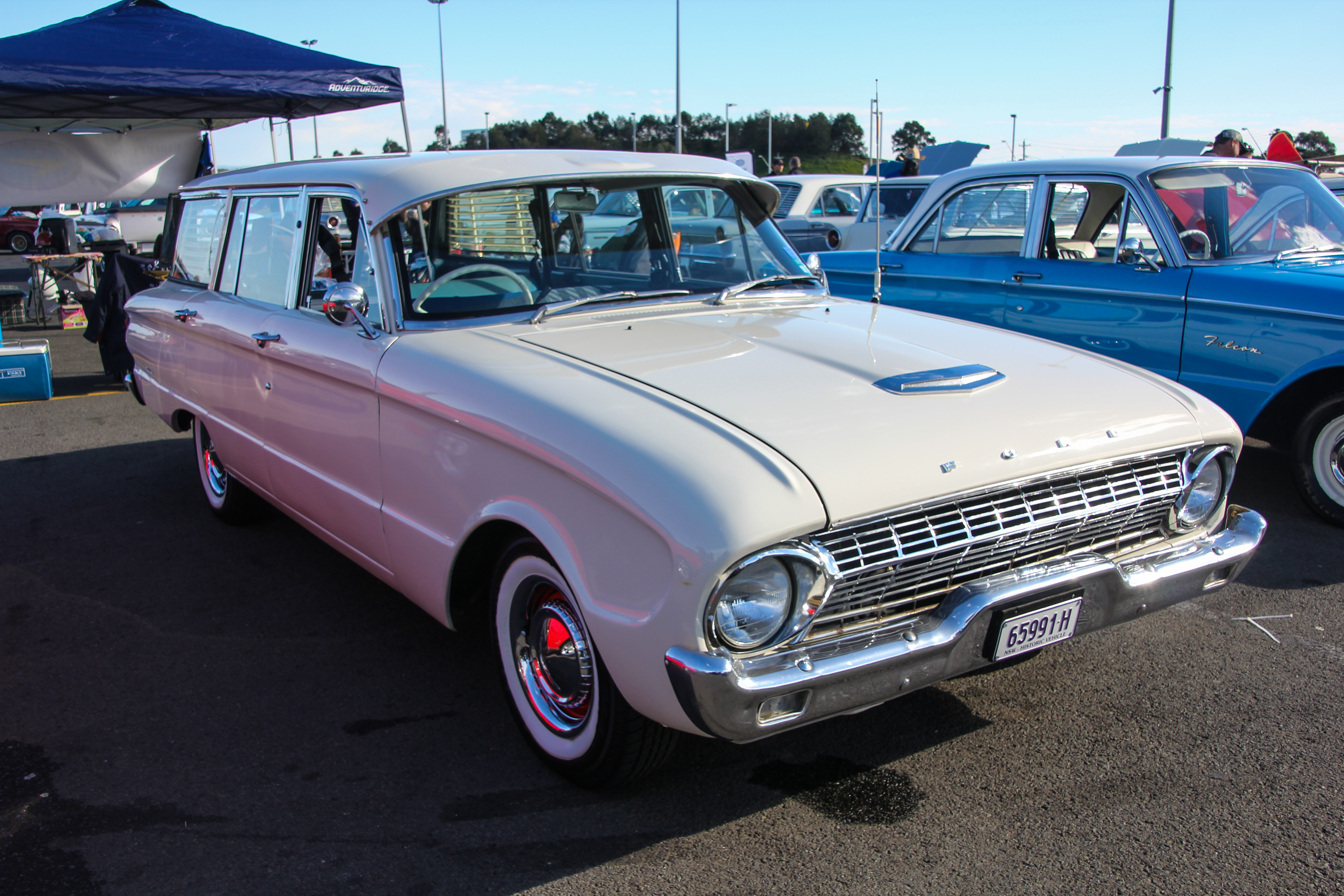
Ford XL Falcon station wagon

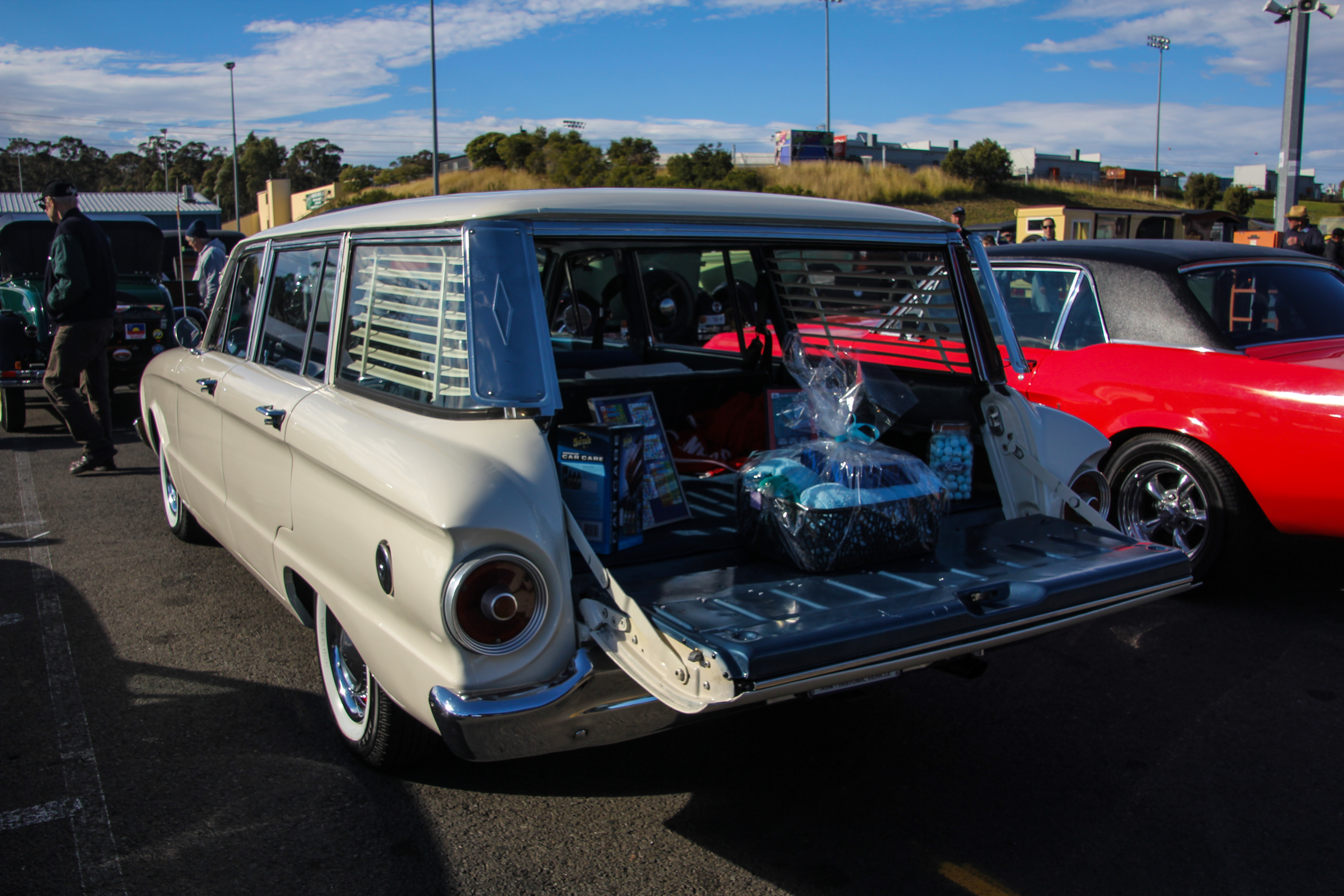
Ford XL Falcon station wagon

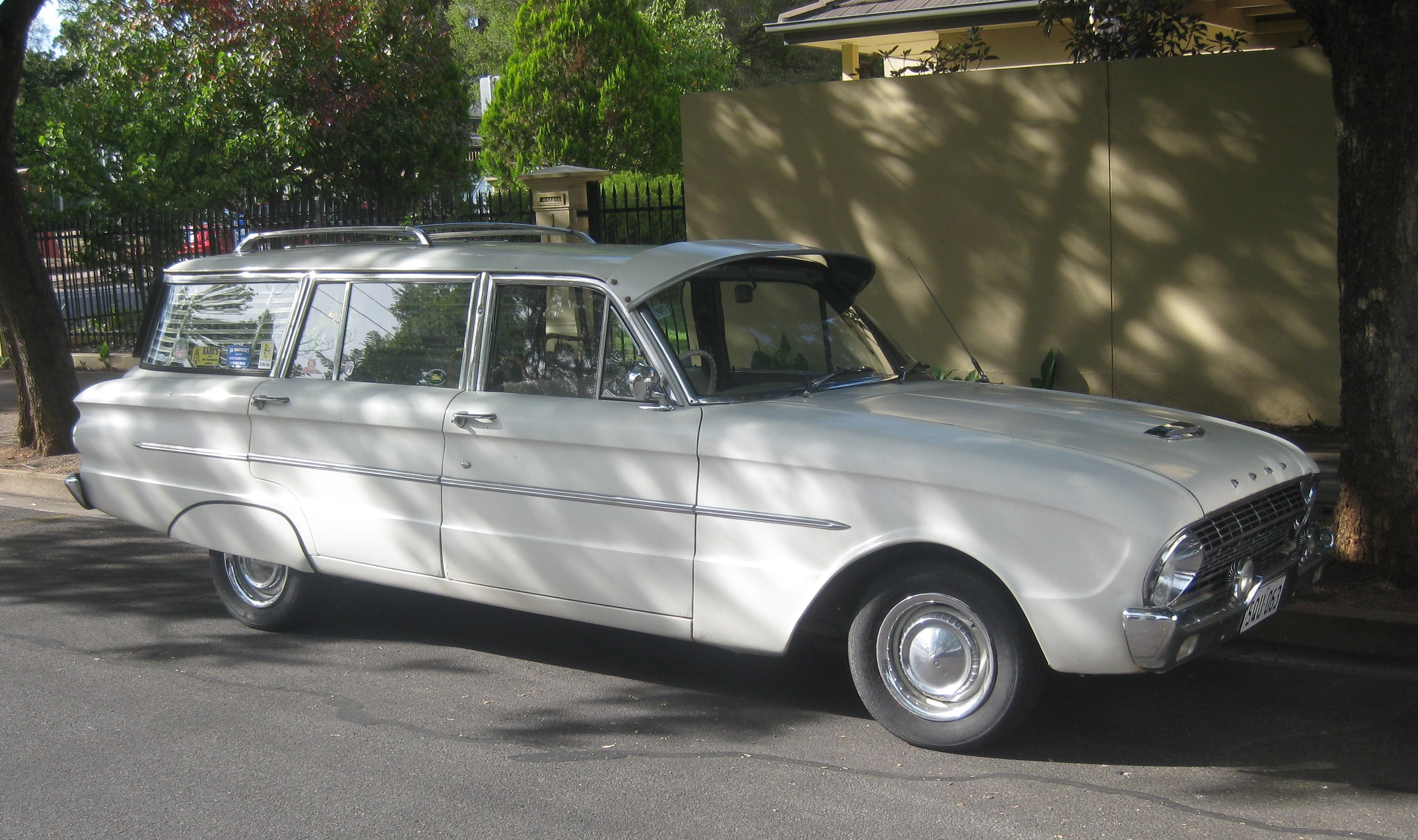
Ford XL Falcon Deluxe station wagon

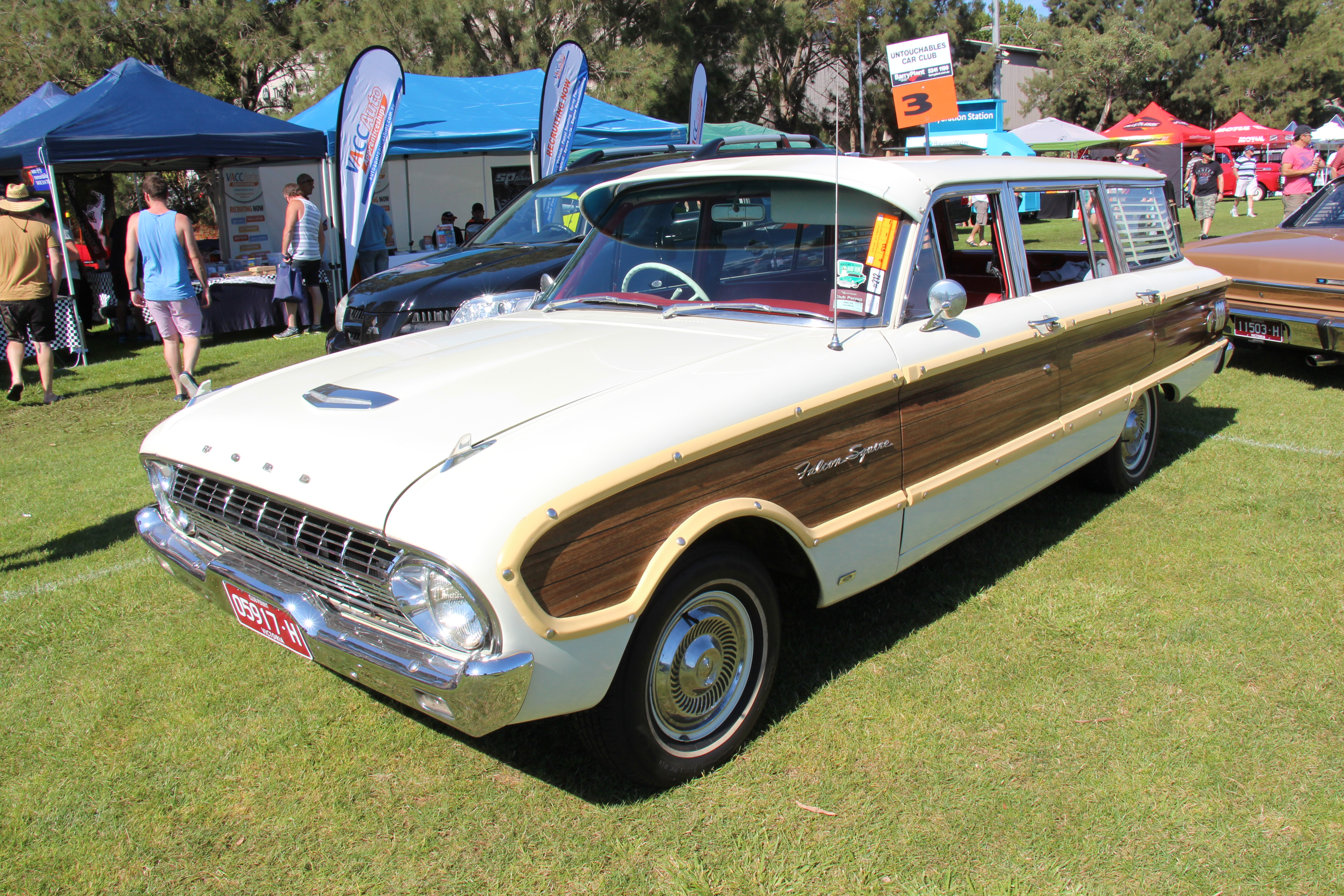
Ford XL Falcon Squire station wagon

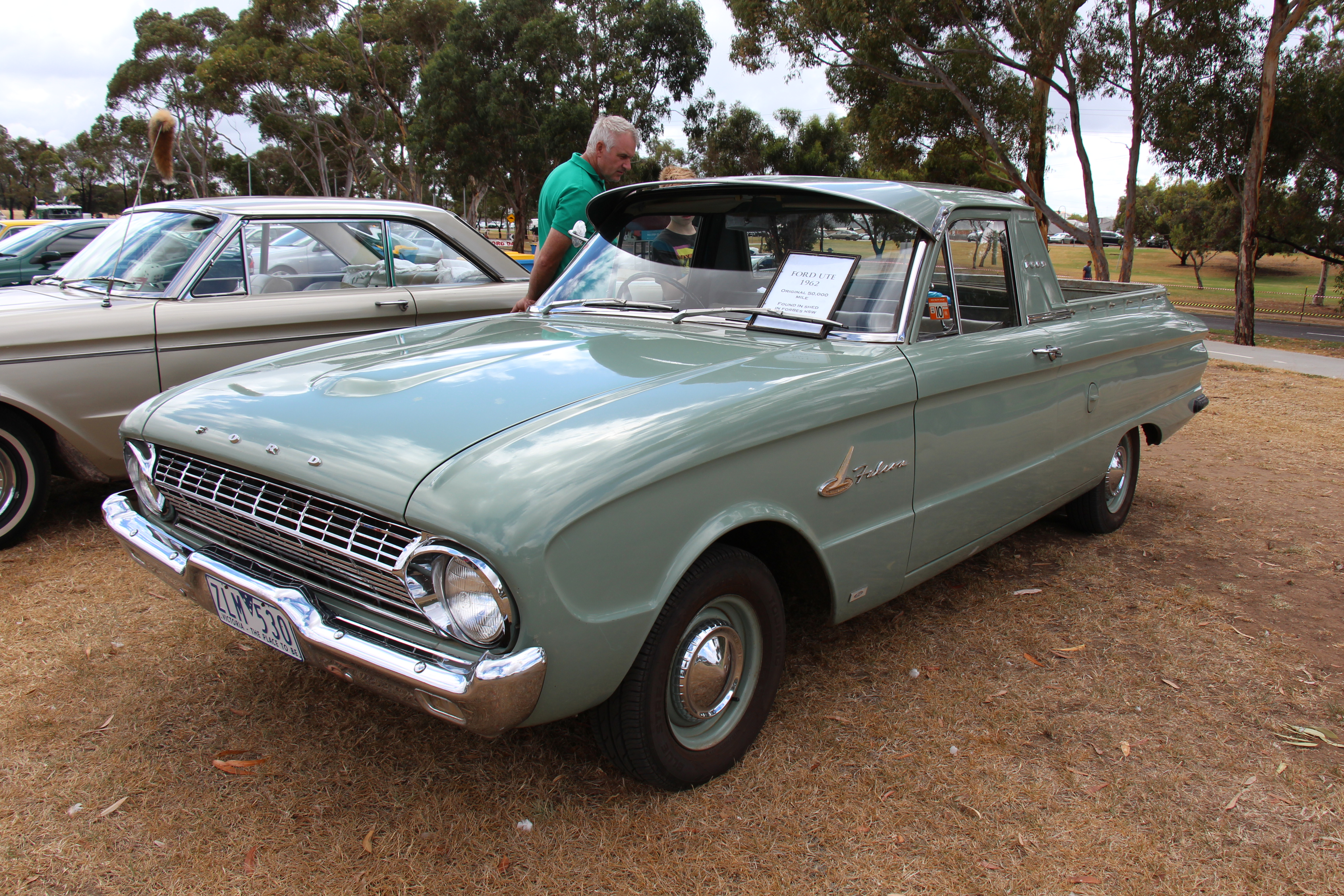
Ford XL Falcon utility

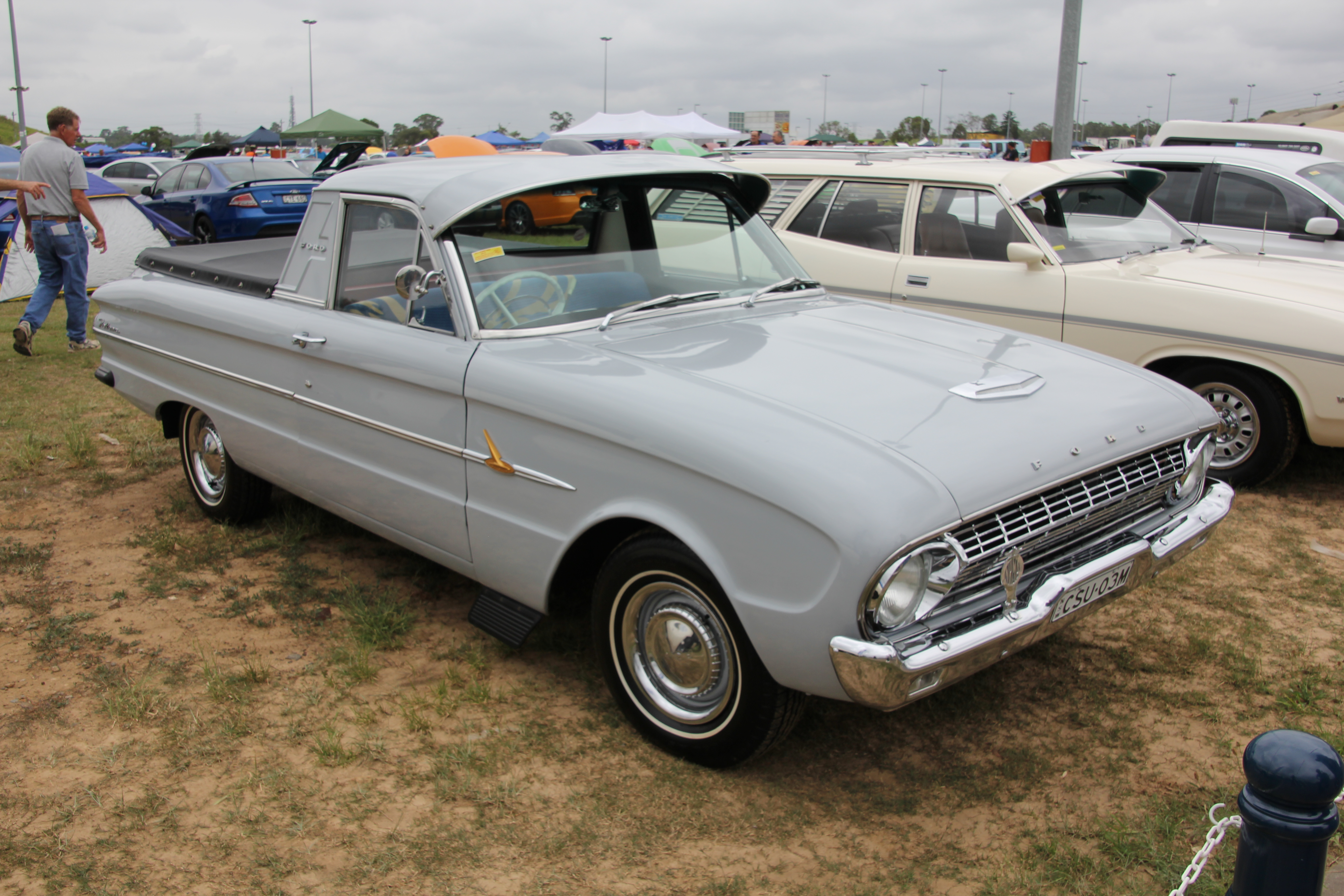
Ford XL Falcon Deluxe utility

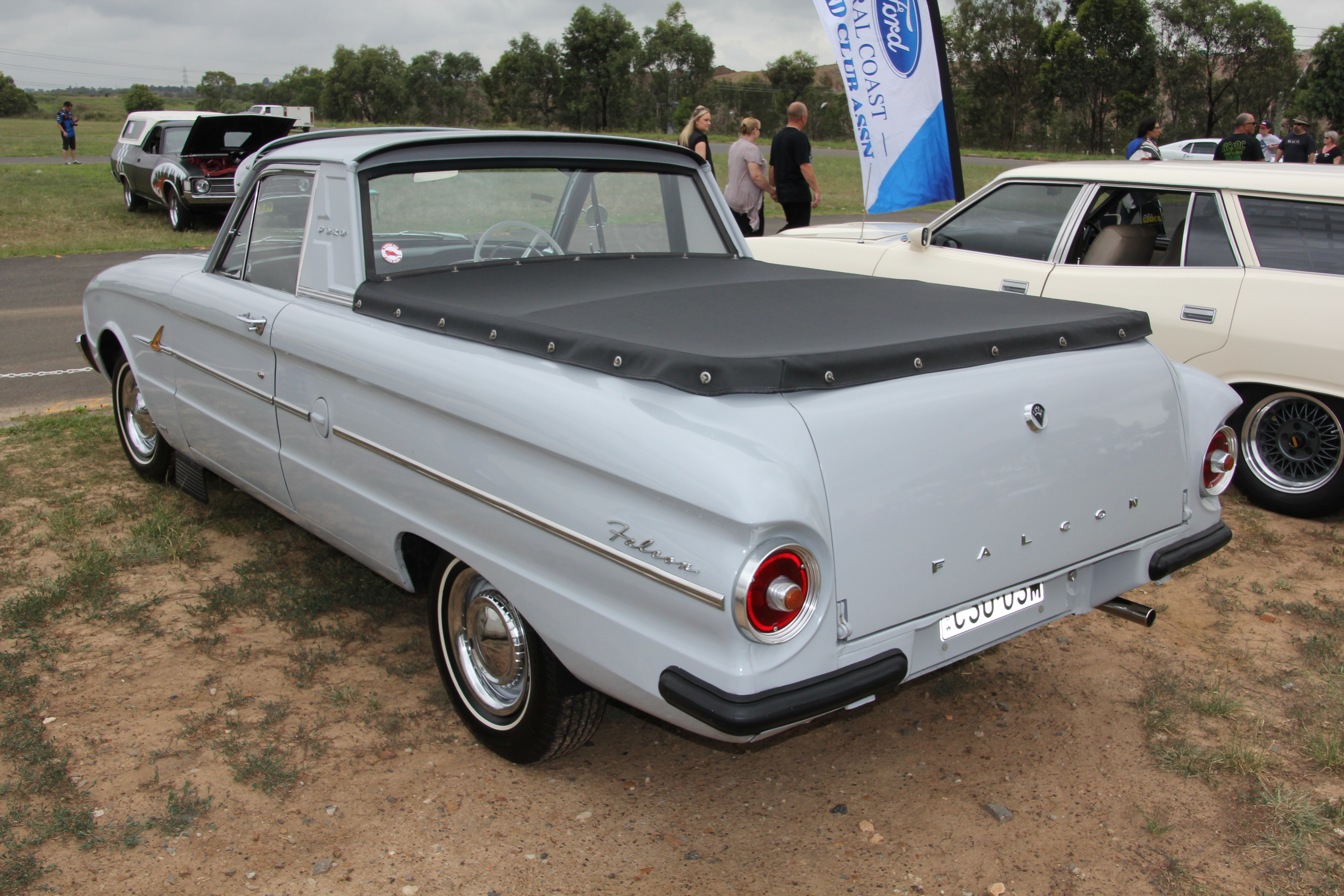
Ford XL Falcon Deluxe utility

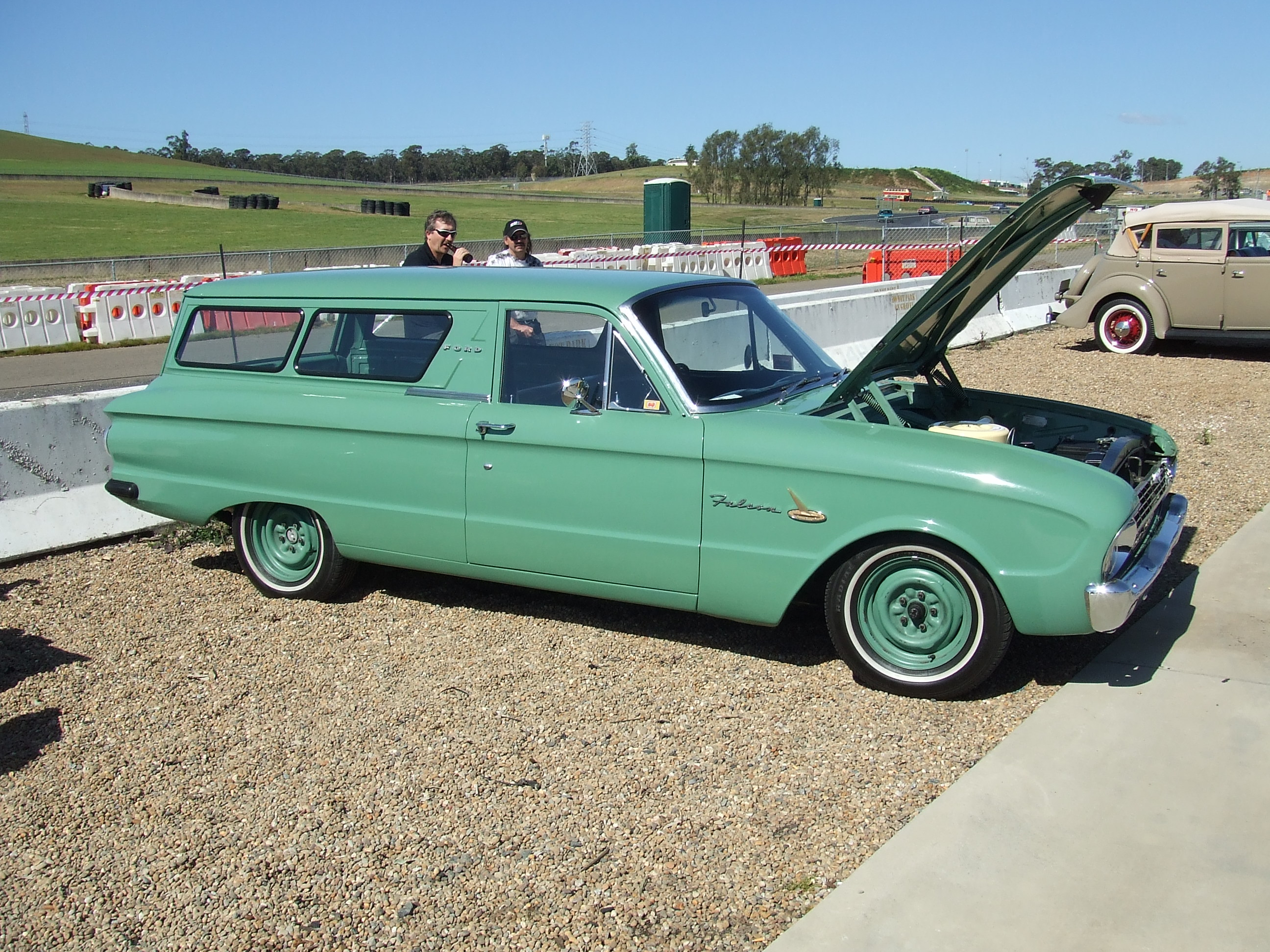
Ford XL Falcon sedan delivery (with additional side windows)

== Production ==
The Falcon XL was replaced by the Ford Falcon (XM) in February 1964, production having totalled 75,765 units.

== Motorsport ==
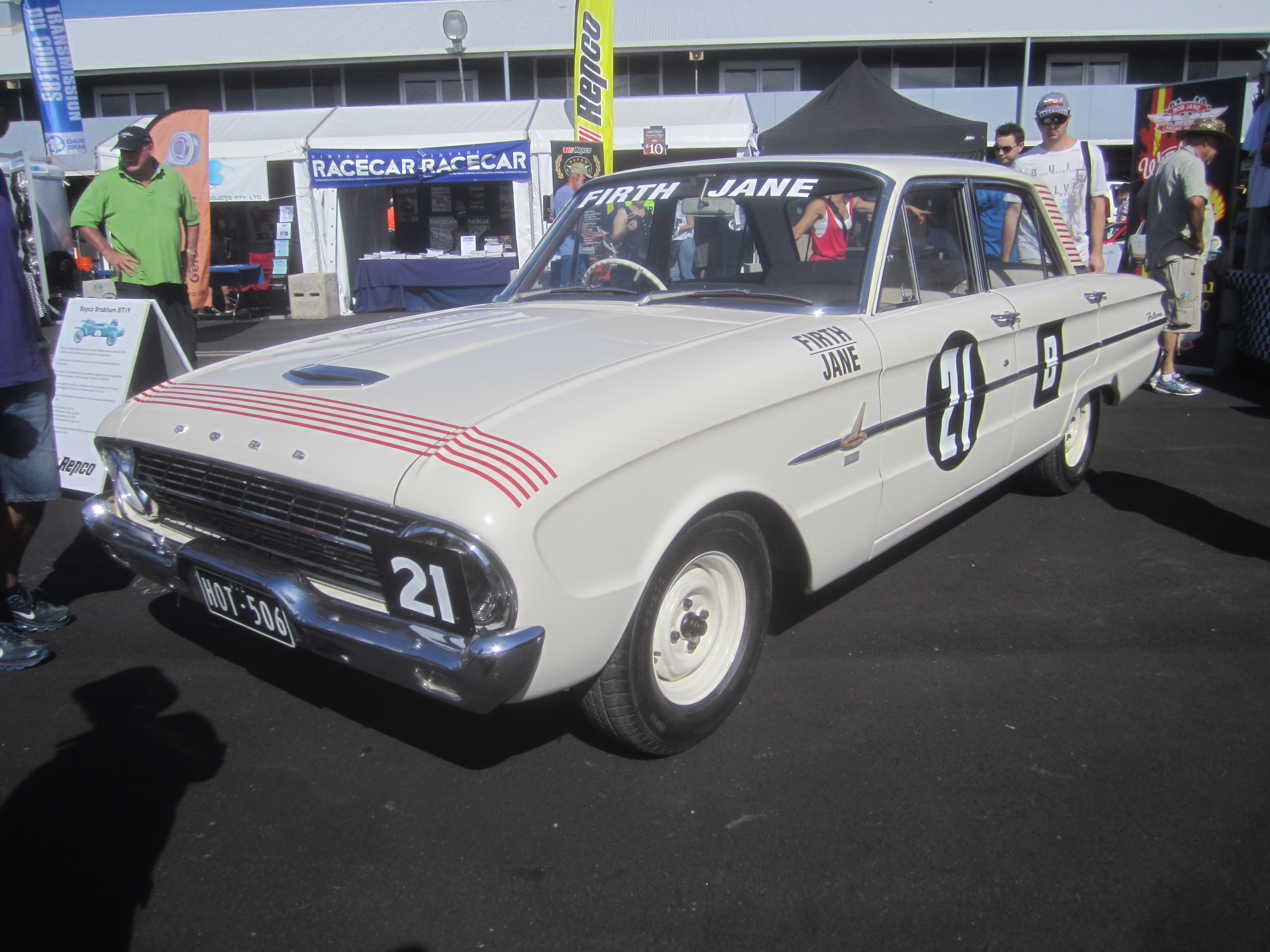
A Ford Falcon XL built up as a tribute to the car which was credited as "First across the line" in the 1962 Armstrong 500

A Falcon XL driven by Bob Jane and Harry Firth was “first across the line” in the 1962 Armstrong 500, with the first four places in Class B filled by Falcon XLs.
