= Lotus Cortina =

Automobile

The Ford Cortina Lotus (commonly known as the Lotus Cortina) is a high-performance sports saloon, which was produced in the United Kingdom from 1963 to 1970 by Ford in collaboration with Lotus Cars. The original version, which was based on the Ford Cortina Mark 1, was promoted by Ford as the "Consul Cortina developed by Lotus", with "Consul" later being dropped from the name. The Mark 2 was based on the Ford Cortina Mark II and was marketed by Ford as the "Cortina Lotus". Lotus gave the model the type number designation Type 28.

There were 3,306 Mark I and 4,093 Mark 2 Lotus Cortinas produced.

== Mk1 ==
Ford Lotus Cortina Mk. I
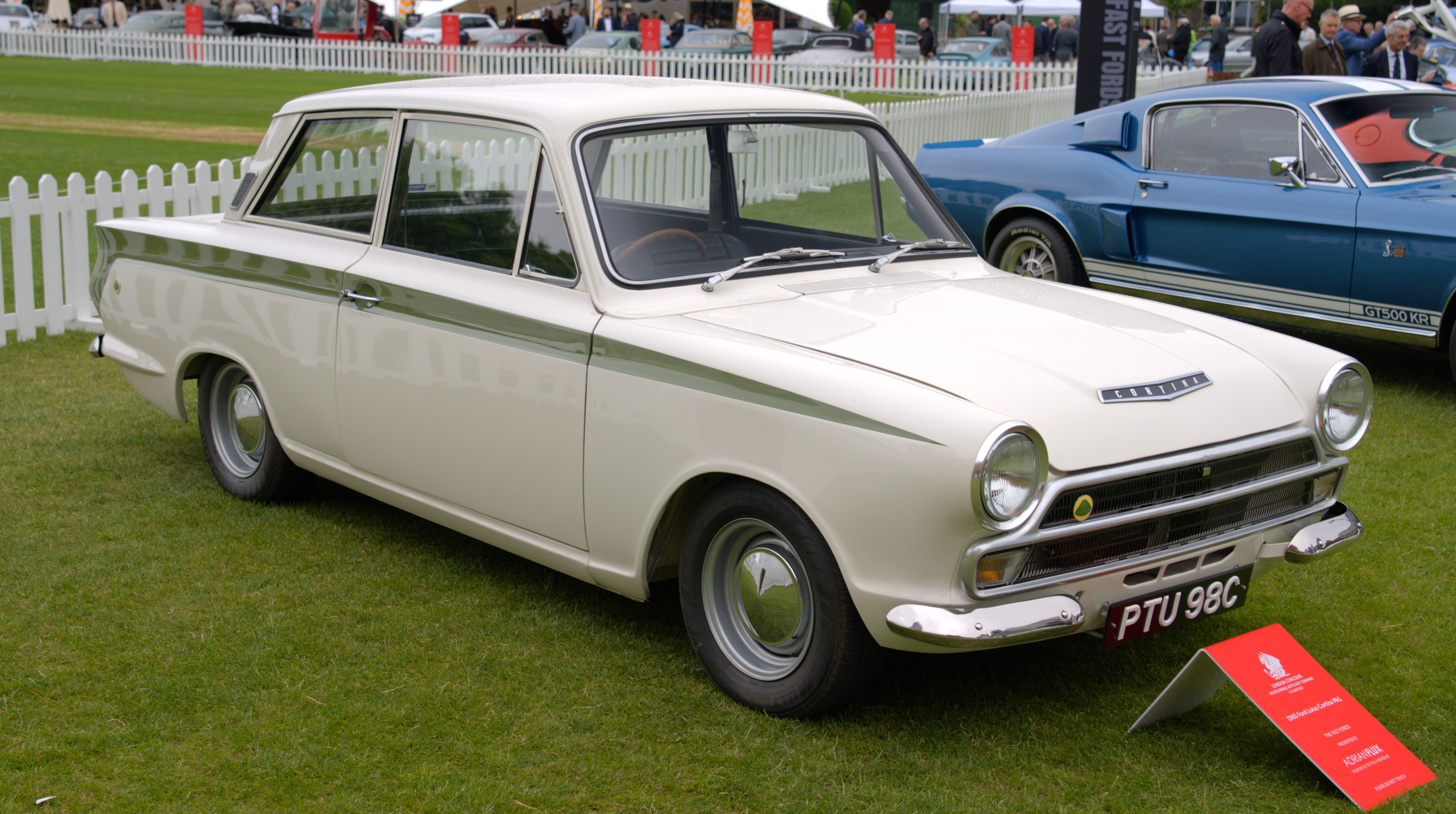
- 1965 Ford Lotus Cortina

Overview
- Manufacturer: Ford
- Production: 1963–1966

Body and chassis
- Class: Compact Sports Car
- Body style: 2-door saloon
- Related: Ford Cortina Mark I

Powertrain
- Engine: 1557 cc Twin-Cam I4

Dimensions
- Wheelbase: 98 in (2,489 mm)
- Length: 168 in (4,267 mm)
- Width: 63 in (1,600 mm)
- Height: 54 in (1,372 mm)

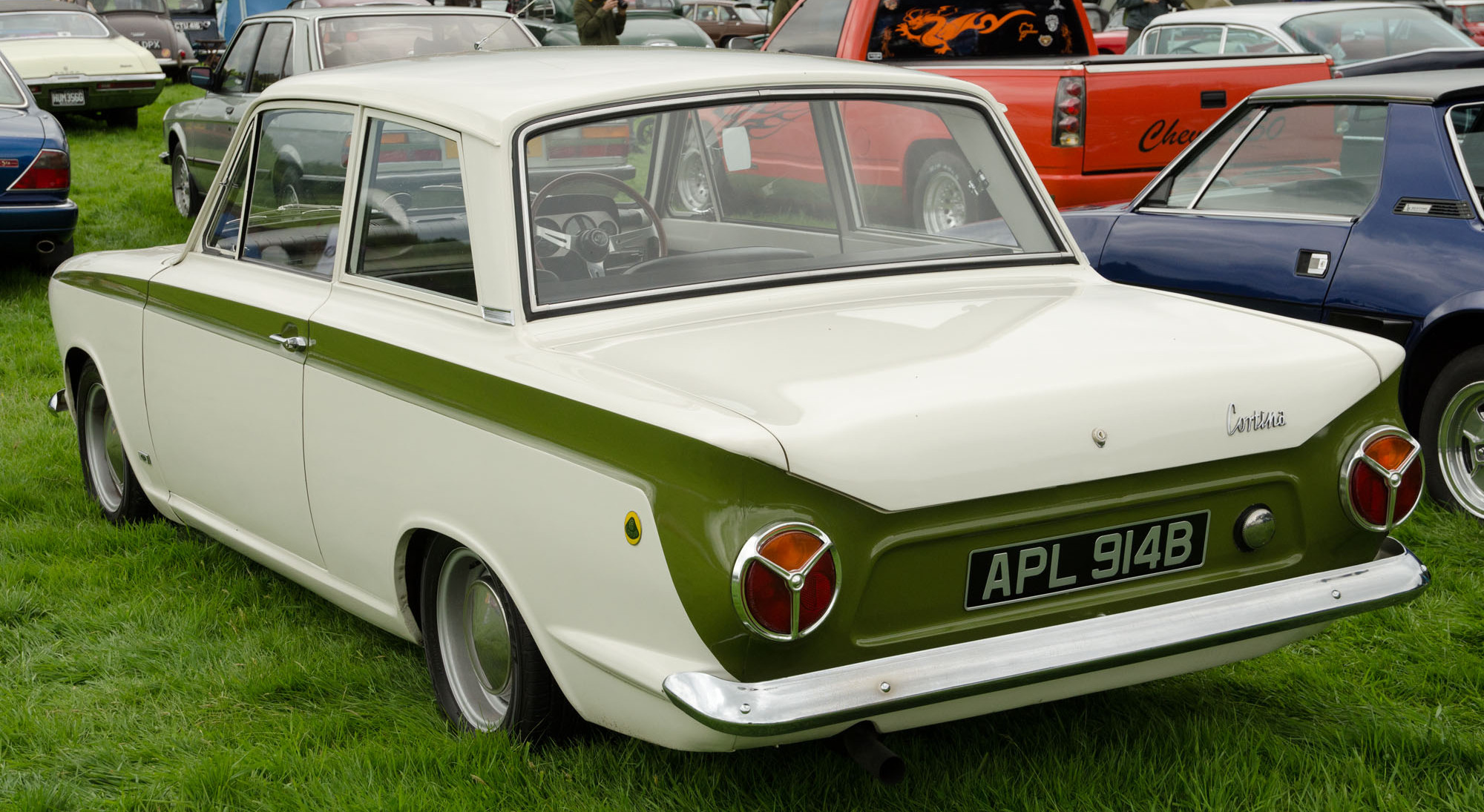
Ford Cortina Lotus Mk 1 (rear view)

The history of the Cortina Lotus began in 1961. Colin Chapman had been wishing to build his own engines for Lotus, mainly because the Coventry Climax unit was so expensive. Colin Chapman's chance came when he commissioned Harry Mundy (a close friend and designer of the Coventry Climax engine and technical editor for Autocar) to design a twin-cam version of the Ford Kent engine. Most of the development of the engine was done on the 997cc and 1,340cc bottom end, but in 1962 Ford released the 116E five bearing 1,498 cc engine and work centred on this. Keith Duckworth, from Cosworth, played an important part in tuning of the engine. The engine's first appearance was in 1962 at the Nürburgring in a Lotus 23 driven by Jim Clark. Almost as soon as the engine appeared in production cars (Lotus Elan), it was replaced with a larger capacity unit (82.55 mm bore to give 1,557 cc). This was in order to get the car closer to the 1.6 litre capacity class in motorsport.

While the engine was being developed, Walter Hayes (Ford) asked Colin Chapman if he would fit the engine to 1,000 Ford saloons for Group 2 homologation. Chapman quickly accepted, although it must have been very busy in the Cheshunt plant, with the Elan about to be launched. The Type 28 or Lotus Cortina or Cortina Lotus (as Ford liked to call it) was duly launched. Ford supplied the 2-door Cortina bodyshells and took care of all the marketing and selling of the cars, whilst Lotus did all the mechanical and cosmetic changes.

The major changes involved installing the 1,557 cc (105 bhp (78 kW; 106 PS)) engine, together with the same close-ratio gearbox as the Elan. The suspension changes were extensive; shorter struts up front, forged track control arms and 5.5J by 13 steel wheel rims. At the rear the leaf springs were replaced by vertical coil spring/dampers and an A- bracket (which connected to the differential housing and brackets near the trailing arm pivot) located the axle. Stiffening braces were put behind the rear seat and from the rear wheelarch down to chassis in the boot. The stiffening braces meant that the spare wheel had to be moved from the standard Cortina's wheel well and was bolted to the left side of the boot floor. The battery was also relocated to the boot, behind the right wheelarch. Both of these changes made improvements to overall weight distribution. Another improvement the Cortina Lotus gained was the new braking system (9.5 in (240 mm) front discs) which were built by brake specialist Girling. This system also was fitted to Cortina GTs but without a servo, which was fitted in the Cortina Lotus engine bay.

Lightweight alloy panels were used for doors, bonnet and boot. Lightweight casings were fitted to gearbox and differential. All the Lotus factory cars were painted white with a green stripe (although Ford built some for racing in red, and one customer had a dark blue stripe due to being superstitious about green). The cars also received front quarter bumpers and round Lotus badges were fitted to rear wings and to the right side of the radiator grille.

Initially, the engines were built by J. A. Prestwich of Tottenham and then Villiers of Wolverhampton. In 1966, Lotus moved to Hethel in Norwich where they had their own engine building facilities. The Cortina Lotus used a 8.0 in (200 mm) diaphragm-spring clutch, whereas Ford fitted coil-spring clutches to the rest of the range. The remainder of the gearbox was identical to the Lotus Elan. This led to a few problems because although the ultra-close gear ratios were perfect for the race track or open road, the clutch was given a hard time in traffic: the ratios were later changed.

Interior modifications were limited to a centre console designed to accommodate the new gear lever position, different seats and the later style dashboard, featuring tachometer, speedometer, oil pressure, water temperature and fuel level gauges. A wood-rimmed steering wheel was fitted.

The early cars were very popular and earned some rave reviews; one magazine described the car as a tin-top version of a Lotus 7. It was 'THE car' for many enthusiasts who before had to settle for a Cortina GT or a Mini-Cooper and it also amazed a lot of the public who were used to overweight 'sports cars' like the Austin-Healey 3000. The launch was not perfect however, the car was too specialist for some Ford dealerships who did not understand the car; there are a few stories of incorrect parts being fitted at services. There were a few teething problems reported by the first batch of owners, (most of these problems show how quickly the car was developed) some of the engines were down on power, the gear ratios were too close and the worst problem was the differential housing coming away from the casing. This problem was mainly caused by the high loads put on the axle because of the A bracket it was an integral part of the rear suspension. This was made even worse by the fact any oil lost from the axle worked its way on to the bushes of the A bracket. There were four main updates made to the Mk1 Lotus during its production to solve some of these problems. The first change was a swap to a two-piece prop shaft and the lighter alloy transmission casing was changed to the standard Ford item; this also included swapping the ultra-close ratio gears for Cortina GT gear ratios, the main difference being that first, second and reverse were much lower (numerically higher) ratios. From 1964, standard steel panels were used rather than the light alloy ones, though alloy items and ultra-close ratios could still be specified when buying a new car.

The second main change came in late 1964 when the entire Cortina range had a facelift which included a full-width front grille and ventilation outlets on the rear C-pillar - because the Cortina Lotus also gained Ford's new Aeroflow system as well as an update to the interior. The third and probably most important change came in mid-1965, when the Lotus rear suspension was changed for the leaf springs and radius arms of the Cortina GT. This replaced all the stiffening tubing as well. The last update also came in 1965 when the rear drums were swapped for self-adjusting items and also the famous 2000E gearbox ratios were used. These lowered first and reverse about halfway between the Cortina GT ratios and the ultra close-ratio box. All these changes made the cars less specialised but far more reliable and all the special parts were still available for competition as well as to members of the public.

The Cortina Lotus had by this time earned an impressive competition reputation. It was also being made in left hand drive when production finished around late 1966 and the Mk2 took over.

== Mk2 ==
Cortina Lotus Mk2
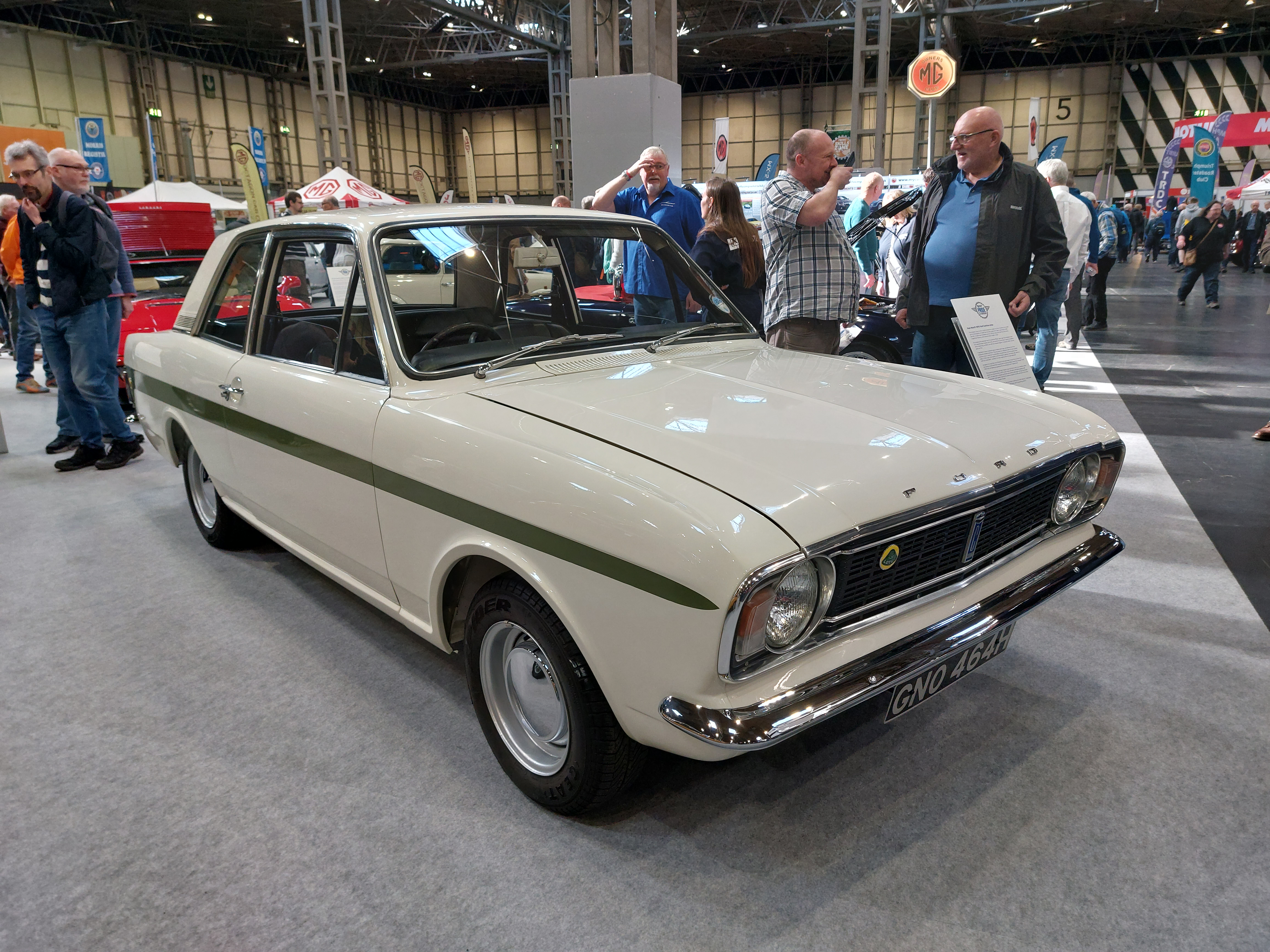
- Ford Cortina Lotus Mk2

Overview
- Also called: Ford Cortina Twin Cam
- Production: 1966–1970

Body and chassis
- Class: Performance car
- Body style: 2-door saloon
- Related: Ford Cortina Mark II

Powertrain
- Engine: 1557 cc Twin-Cam I4

Dimensions
- Wheelbase: 249 cm (98.0 in)
- Length: 427 cm (168.1 in)
- Width: 165 cm (65.0 in)
- Height: 139 cm (54.7 in)

Chronology
- Successor: Lotus Carlton

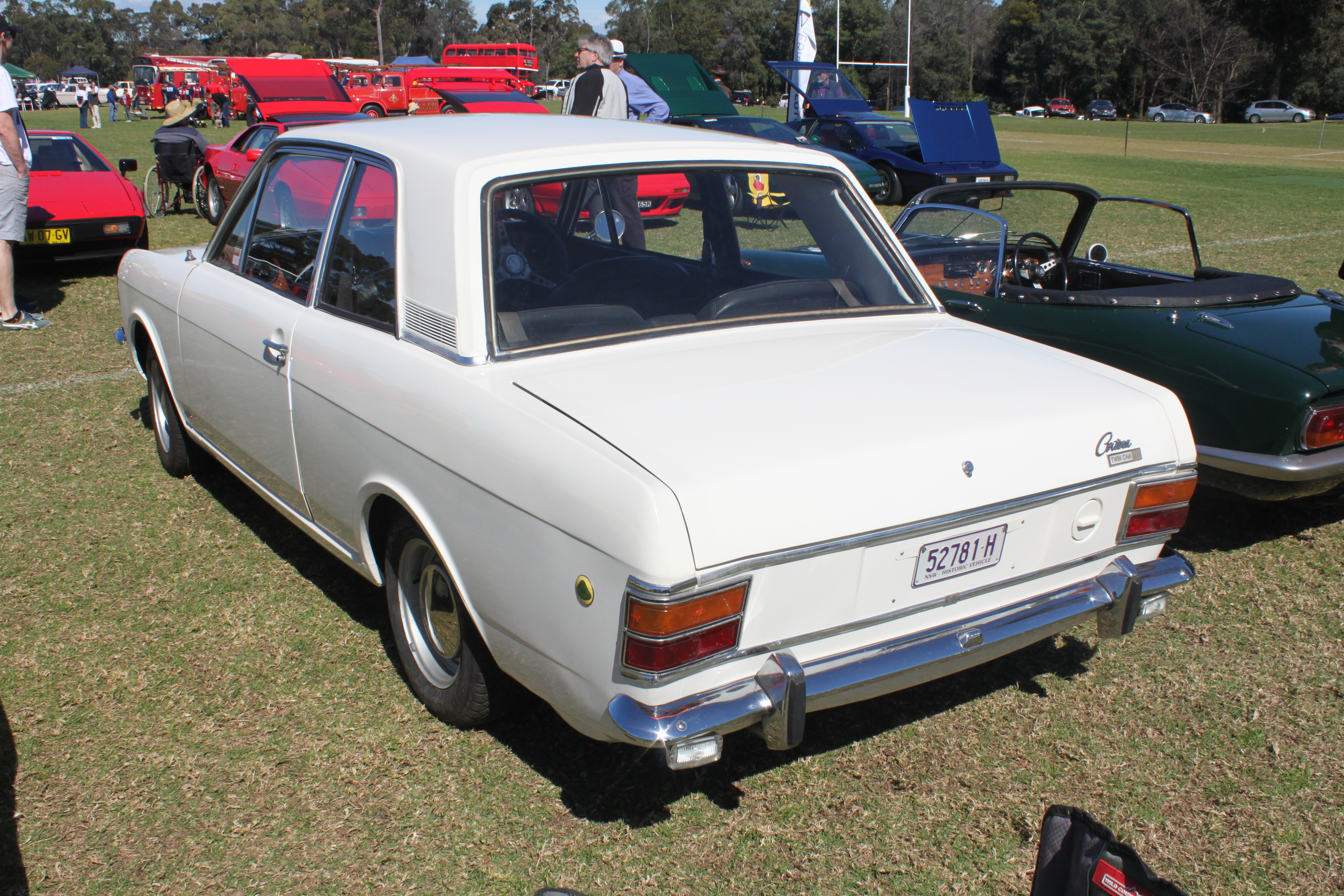
Ford Cortina Lotus Mk2 (rear view)

Ford wanted to change a few things for the Mk2, the Mk1 had done all and more than they could expect in competition, but the public linked its competition wins with Lotus and its bad points with Ford. Ford still wanted to build a Mk2 Lotus and compete with it, but Lotus were moving from Cheshunt to Hethel so it was a bad time for them to build another model. Ford were also concerned with the unreliability of the Lotus built cars, so a decision was made at Ford that to continue with its competition drive and make the car more cost effective they would make the car at Dagenham themselves, alongside the other Cortina models. In order to do this the Mk2 had to be much easier to build than the Mk1 so that it could be made alongside Mk2 GT production, just with a different engine and suspension. The Mk2 took a while to appear, first appearing in 1967. Unlike the Mk1, the Mk2 was also made in left hand drive from the start of production.

The Mk2 had a different choice of colours and no stripe, although most had them fitted at Ford dealers at extra cost. Other cosmetics changes were a black front grille, 5.5J x 13 steel wheels and Lotus badges on rear wings and by the rear number plate. The badge on the front grille was an option at first.

The Mk2 Cortina Lotus also gained an improved and more powerful (109 bhp (81 kW; 111 PS)) engine, which was formerly supplied as the special equipment engine option on Lotus Elan and the Cortina Lotus Mk1. The gearbox ratios remained 2000E ones but the car now used the Mk2 GT remote-control gearchange. The car also had a different final drive of 3.77:1 rather than 3.9:1.

The Mk2 was a wider car than the Mk1, so although they looked the same, the steel wheels had a different offset so as not to upset the tracking, and radial tyres were now standard. Another attraction was the larger fuel tank. The spare wheel could now be mounted in its wheel well, but the battery remained in the boot to aid weight distribution.

The only real difference to the engine bay was the air cleaner mounted on top of the engine. The interior was almost identical to a GT. The Mk2 did exactly what Ford wanted, it was far more reliable whilst still quick enough to be used in competition, until it was replaced by the Escort Twin Cam.

The car did receive a few updates, but none as urgent as the Mk1's. Only a few months after production started, the Lotus badge on the rear panel was cancelled and a new TWIN CAM badge was fitted under the Cortina script on the boot lid. Despite the badge changes, Ford UK continued to market the model as the "Cortina Lotus". The new combined clock and centre console was fitted. In late 1968 the entire Mk2 range received some cosmetic changes; for the Lotus, this meant that the 4 dials on top of the dash were brought down and made part of the dash. An internal bonnet release and a more conventional mounting for the handbrake were also phased in. A new single-rail gearshift mechanism was used. The car stayed in production until 1970.

The Cortina Lotus was marketed in Europe as the Cortina Twin Cam in 1969/70.

At least four 4-door versions were supplied to the Mid-Anglia Constabulary and Thames Valley Police for evaluation as use as a fast patrol and pursuit car by British Police forces. At least two vehicles are still in existence.

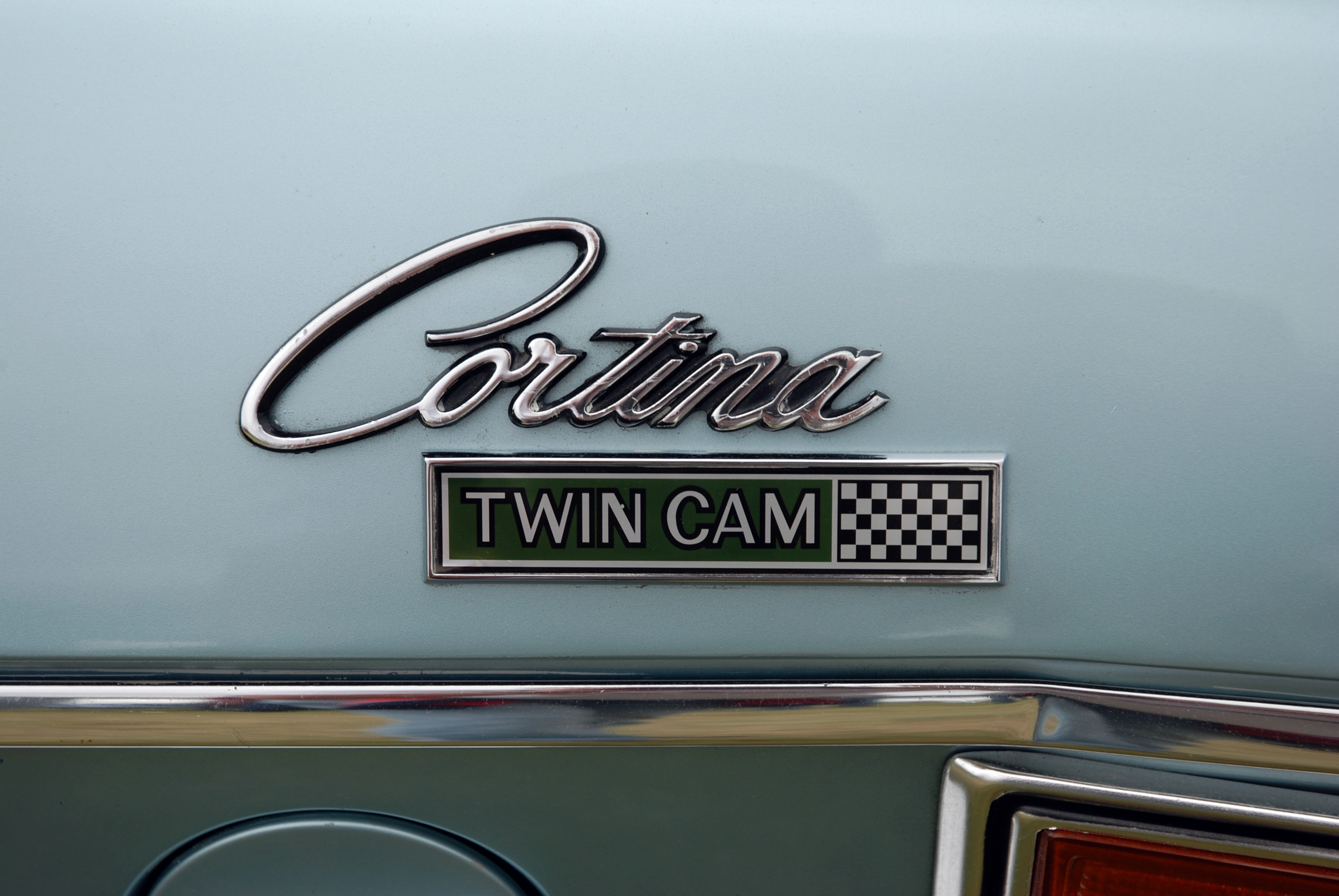
Cortina Lotus badging was changed to Cortina Twin Cam during the life of the Mark 2

== Racing ==
To homologate the car for Group 2 Touring Car racing, 1000 were required to be built in 1963, and the car was duly homologated in September 1963. In the same month, in the car's first outing, in the Oulton Park Gold Cup, the car finished 3rd and 4th behind two Ford Galaxies, but beat the 3.8-litre Jaguars which had been dominant in saloon car racing for so long. Soon Ford were running cars in Britain, Europe, and the US, with Team Lotus running cars in Britain for Ford, and Alan Mann Racing running cars in Europe, also on behalf of Ford. The Cortina Lotus was able to beat almost anything except the 7-litre V8 Ford Galaxies, and later, Ford Mustangs.

In 1964, a Cortina Lotus leading around a bend with its inside front wheel in fresh air became a familiar sight, as the cars were set up with soft rear suspension and a hard front end. Jim Clark won the British Saloon Car Championship easily, in the US, Jackie Stewart and Mike Beckwith won the Malboro 12-hour, and Alan Mann Racing also performed well in the European Touring Car Challenge, including a 1–2 victory in the 'Motor' Six Hour International Touring Car Race at Brands Hatch. A Boreham-built car also won its class, came 4th outright, and won the handicap section, in the 4000 mile 10-day Tour de France. Other Cortina Lotus achievements included the Austrian Saloon Car Championship, the South African National Saloon Championship, the Swedish Ice Championship, and the Wills Six-Hour in New Zealand.

1965 saw the Cortina Lotus winning regularly, the car being more competitive due to the increased reliability of the new leaf spring rear end. Driving for Alan Mann Racing, Sir John Whitmore dominated and won the European Touring Car Championship in KPU-392C, Jack Sears won his class in the British Saloon Car Championship (a Mustang won outright), Jackie Ickx won the Belgian Saloon Car Championship, and a Cortina Lotus won the New Zealand Gold Star Saloon Car Championship. Other wins were the Nürburgring Six-Hour race, the Swedish National Track Championship, and the Snetterton 500.

In 1966, Team Lotus registered new cars for the British Saloon Car Championship, which was now open to Group 5 Special Touring Cars, as regulations had been changed. Fuel-injection and dry sumping were allowed, and with Lucas injection and tuning by BRM, the engines could produce 180 bhp (130 kW; 180 PS) at 7750 rpm, increasing their ability to stay with the Mustangs. The cars also had the MacPherson struts replaced with coil springs and shock absorbers and a revised wishbone geometry. They scored 8 class wins, many driven by Jim Clark. In the European Touring Car Challenge, Sir John Whitmore scored another four wins, not enough to give him the title, being beaten by Alfa Romeo Giulia GTAs.

Cortina Lotus Mark 1's are a consistent class winner in modern Historic Touring Car racing throughout the world. The fastest official recorded speed is 147 mph (237 km/h) at Mount Panorama Bathurst in Australia by Marc Ducquet. The recorded speed by radar on Conrod Straight was 143 mph. The car was owned by Bob Pearson and had a 203HP Twin Cam engine built by Randall Edgell in New Zealand. 185/60-13 Radial tyres, 4.3 differential and 9,500 RPM. Considering the relatively low horsepower of the standard pushrod GT500 Cortina and the Lightweight alloy panelled Cortina Lotus this speed is achievable. For example, the legendary Australian driver "Gelignite Jack" Murray driving a Cortina GT500 - Australia's answer to the Cortina Lotus produced to comply with the local build requirements to be able to be raced of 100 units; initial batch 122, as opposed to running the Cortina Lotus which would have been imported with a minimum requirement of 250 - built by and intended for Harry Firth in the 1965 Bathurst 500 was clocked at 118 mph down Conrod Straight using a 3.9 diff, Lotus gearbox, large diameter (non radial) tyres and 7,900 rpm.

The Cortina is well known in the US for its competitiveness in the under 2000 cc class of the Trans Am Series. Canadian born Australian Allan Moffat shocked the outright class cars, winning Round 3 of the inaugural series in 1966 at the Bryar Motorsports Park in Loudon, New Hampshire.

== Rallying ==
Whilst the Cortina Lotus is somewhat overshadowed by the success of the Ford Escort in rallying, it performed admirably in the mid-1960s, which might be surprising, given its reputation for unreliability. The first Cortina Lotus to be rallied was a Cortina GT with the Lotus engine, in the 1963 Spa-Sofia-Liege rally in September, just to try out the engine, and driven by Henry Taylor to 4th place. The first outing in a rally by a Cortina Lotus proper was in the 1963 RAC Rally, campaigned again by Taylor, with co-driver Brian Melia. It finished 6th somehow, in spite of its A-bracket rear end needing constant attention. The A-bracket was persevered with by Vic Elford and David Seigle-Morris for the 1964 Tour de France Automobile, a 10-day, 4,000-mile (6,400 km) event, as it was run completely on sealed roads, unlike the rough RAC Rally. Their car came 4th outright in the Touring Car category, and first in the Handicap category, in a mix of one-hour sprints, hillclimbs, and mountain road rallying.

Still, the general dodginess of the A-bracket suspension meant that Ford decided to replace it with the more conventional GT rear suspension. This became available in June 1965, and while the car still seemed to be afflicted with bad luck, a few victories were racked up. Four of the newly updated cars competed in the Alpine rally of July 1965, and Vic Elford's car led outright, all the way. Well, until less than an hour from finishing, when a piece of the distributor fell out and delayed the car 26 minutes. All four cars retired from that year's RAC rally, which was severely snow-affected. The first works victory came in December 1965, when Roger Clark and Graham Robson won the Welsh International.

In 1966, Ford managed to homologate the car for Group 1, which requires 5000 cars to be built. In the Monte Carlo Rally, Roger Clark finished 4th, only to be disqualified, and then Elford finished 1st in the Rallye Sanremo (Rally of the Flowers), only to be disqualified as well. Elford came 2nd in the Tulip Rally. Bengt Söderström was named victor of the Acropolis Rally, after the 1st-placed Mini Cooper S was disqualified. New cars were used for the Coupe des Alpes (Alpine Rally), where Elford's engine blew up after leading, while Roger Clark finished second. Clark was always competitive, but suffered with unreliable cars, coming 3rd in the Canadian Shell 4000, 2nd in Greece, and 4th in Poland. The Cortina Lotus finally proved itself with an outright win in the RAC rally. F1 World Champion Jim Clark crashed his (twice), but Söderström saw his through to a 13-minute victory, with Gunnar Palm. Other victories in 1966 were in the Geneva rally by Staepelaere, and by Canadian Paul MacLellan in the Shell 4000. A final win before the advent of the Mk. II was also pulled off by Söderström in the snowy Swedish Rally of February 1967.Australian rally driver Harry Firth did win the first edition of the Australian Rally Championship in 1968 with the Lotus Cortina.
