= 1976 Australian Rally Championship =

Seasons
- ← 1975 1977 →

The 1976 Australian Rally Championship was a series of six rallying events held across Australia. It was the ninth season in the history of the competition.

Ross Dunkerton and navigator Jeff Beaumont in the Datsun 240Z were the winners of the 1976 Championship.

== Season review ==
The ninth Australian Rally Championship was held over six events across Australia, the season consisting of two events for Victoria and one each for Queensland, New South Wales, South Australia and Western Australia. The 1976 season saw the domination of the Datsun 240Z of Dunkerton for the second year running, winning convincingly with navigator Jeff Beaumont (four wins and a second). Their main opposition came from Dean Rainsford and Graham West in the Porsche Carrera. The results of the season could have been different had it not been for the controversy over the eligibility of George Fury's Datsun 710 Coupe. This car was FIA homologated and as such was eligible for the international Southern Cross Rally, but deemed to be ineligible for the ARC.

== The Rallies ==
The six events of the 1976 season were as follows.

Round	Rally	Date
1	Rally of the West (WA)	
2	SEV Marchal Rally (VIC)	
3	Bega Valley Rally (NSW)	
4	Rally Renault (SA)	
5	North Eastern Rally (VIC)	
6	Warana Rally (QLD)	

=== Round Three – Bega Valley Rally ===
Position	Driver	Navigator	Car	Points
1	Ross Dunkerton	Jeff Beaumont	Datsun 240Z	34
2	Dean Rainsford	Graham West	Porsche Carrera RS	36
3	Adrian Taylor	John Souminen	Honda Civic	55
4	David Jones	Ian Pearson	Mitsubishi Galant	68
5=	Ed Mulligan	Fred Gocentas	Holden Torana L34	71
5=	Peter Gaudron	Graeme Pigram	Datsun 1600	71

=== Round Six – Lutwyche Village Warana Rally ===
Position	Driver	Navigator	Car	Points
1	Murray Coote	Brian Marsden	Datsun 1600	
2	Ross Dunkerton	Jeff Beaumont	Datsun 260Z	
3	Henk Kabel	Simon Kabel	Mazda RX-3	
4	Ron Marks	Graham Gillies	Lancia Stratos	
5	David Jones	Ian Pearson	Mitsubishi Galant	
6	Jim Reddiex	Greg Sked	Citroen CX 2200	

== 1976 Drivers and Navigators Championships ==
Final pointscore for 1976 is as follows.

=== Ross Dunkerton – Champion Driver 1976 ===
Position	Driver	Car	Points
1	Ross Dunkerton	Datsun 240Z	
2	Dean Rainsford	Porsche Carrera RS	
3	David Jones	Mitsubishi Galant	
4	Danny Bignell		
5	Murray Coote		
6	Evan Green		

=== Jeff Beaumont – Champion Navigator 1976 ===
Position	Navigator	Car	Points
1	Jeff Beaumont	Datsun 240Z	
2	Graham West	Porsche Carrera RS	
3	Ian Pearson	Mitsubishi Galant	
4	Brian Marsden		
5	Simon Kabel		
6	John Bryson		
