= 1981 Australian Rally Championship =

Seasons
- ← 1980 1982 →

The 1981 Australian Rally Championship was a series of rallying events held across Australia. It was the 14th season in the history of the competition.

Geoff Portman and navigator Ross Runnalls in the Datsun Stanza won the 1981 Championship.

== Season review ==
The 1981 season saw the Datsun Stanzas dominate the competition once more, taking out first, second and third places in the championship. It was the sixth championship for Datsun in seven years, with wins in all five rounds. The Nissan Rally Team were the only "works" supported team competing in the championship following the withdrawal of the Ford Rally and Holden Dealer teams at the end of the 1980 season. This was the final season for the Nissan Rally Team when Nissan transferred their interest to circuit racing with the turbo charged Nissan Bluebird.

== The Rallies ==
The five events of the 1981 season were as follows.

Round	Rally	Date
1	Rally of the West (WA)	
2	Lutwyche Village Rally (QLD)	
3	Bega Valley Rally (NSW)	
4	Akademos Rally (VIC)	
5	Alpine Rally (VIC)	

=== Round One – Commonwealth Bank Rally of the West ===
Position	Driver	Navigator	Car	Time
1	Ross Dunkerton	Jeff Beaumont	Datsun Stanza	262.41
2	Clive Slater	Rod van der Straaten	Toyota Corolla	263.40
3	Bob Nicoli	Peter McNeall	Datsun P510	268.24
4	Jim Marden	Adrian Stafford	Datsun P510	281.23
5	Chris Hake	Vicki Hake	Datsun P510	285.06
6	Mark Anderson	Tim Hatley	Datsun P510	288.44
7	Frank Johnson	Brian Small	Mazda 323	288.48
8	Peter Flood	Graham Romyn	Holden Gemini	293.51
9	Murray Coote	Brian Marsden	Mazda 626	296.43
10	Ed Mulligan	Geoff Jones	Escort BDA	298.21

=== Round Two – Lutwyche Village Rally ===
Position	Driver	Navigator	Car	Time
1	Geoff Portman	Ross Runnalls	Datsun Stanza SSS	5h 15m 31s
2	Ross Dunkerton	Jeff Beaumont	Datsun Stanza SSS	5h 16m 52s
3	George Fury	Monty Suffern	Datsun Stanza SSS	5h 19m 47s
4	Murray Coote	Brian Marsden	Mazda 626	5h 29m 13s
5	Peter Phillips	Peter Garbett	Datsun 1600	5h 39m 14s
6	Mark Hankinson	Graham Moule	Toyota T-18	5h 53m 58s
7	John Berne	Bruce Fullerton	Ford Escort RS2000	5h 57m 35s
8	Doug Thompson	Ron Lugg	Datsun Stanza SSS	5h 59m 33s
9	Bruce Garland	Allan Brown	Ford Escort	6h 02m 33s
10	Peter Kelly	Greg Coonan	Ford Escort	6h 04m 32s

=== Round Three – Bega Valley Rally ===
Position	Driver	Navigator	Car	Time
1	Geoff Portman	Ross Runnalls	Datsun Stanza SSS	4h 31m 22s
2	Wayne Bell	Col Parry	Holden Commodore	4h 41m 13s
3	Chris Brown	Simon Brown	Datsun 180B	4h 43m 06s
4	Gordon Leven	Robbie Wilson	Datsun Stanza SSS	4h 52m 26s
5	Doug Thompson	Ron Lugg	Datsun Stanza SSS	4h 52m 47s
6	Ian McKenzie	Mick Harker	Datsun 1600	4h 55m 36s
7	John Fraser	Guenter Nowacki	Mitsubishi Lancer	4h 57m 44s
8	Chris Berry	John Robinson	Datsun	5h 02m 31s
9	Paul Bramble	Kelvin Hayes	Mitsubishi Galant	5h 03m 49s
10	Peter Glennie	Mike Ryan	Datsun 200B	5h 04m 05s

=== Round Four – Akademos Rally ===
Position	Driver	Navigator	Car	Time
1	Geoff Portman	Ross Runnalls	Datsun Stanza SSS	2h 46m 13s
2	George Fury	Monty Suffern	Datsun Stanza SSS	2h 48m 22s
3	Wayne Bell	Col Parry	Holden Commodore	2h 57m 34s
4	Chris Brown	Simon Brown	Datsun 180B	2h 58m 32s
5	John Atkinson	Bob Comley	Datsun Stanza SSS	3h 03m 36s
6	John Bramman	Geoff Cuttriss	Ford Escort Twin Cam	3h 09m 38s
7	Peter Glover	Sue Wiseman	Ford Escort	3h 09m 51s
8	Gordon Leven	Robert Wilson	Datsun Stanza SSS	3h 12m 03s
9	Garry Harrowfield	Ian Ellis	Datsun 1600	3h 18m 29s
10	Gary Crealy	Barry Collins	Datsun 1600	3h 18m 59s

=== Round Five – Alpine Rally ===
Position	Driver	Navigator	Car	Time
1	Geoff Portman	Ross Runnalls	Datsun Stanza SSS	5h 58m 12s
2	George Fury	Monty Suffern	Datsun Stanza SSS	6h 07m 14s
3	Doug Thompson	Ron Lugg	Datsun Stanza SSS	6h 14m 07s
4	Alex Fitcher	Noel Richards	Datsun 1600	6h 18m 24s
5	John Berne	David Pieti	Ford Escort BDA	6h 25m 32s
6	Ian Swan	Mike Prendergast	Datsun Stanza SSS	6h 30m 23s
7	Chris Wall	Lloyd Minifie	Datsun P510	6h 33m 42s
8	Greg Trotter	Phil Yeomans	Mazda RX-3	6h 34m 53s
9	Peter Nelson	Graham Moule	Datsun H510 SSS	6h 40m 41s
10	John Atkinson	Bob Comley	Datsun Stanza SSS	6h 41m 09s

== 1981 Drivers and Navigators Championships ==
Final pointscore for 1981 is as follows.

=== Geoff Portman – Champion Driver 1981 ===
Position	Driver	Car	Points
1	Geoff Portman	Datsun Stanza SSS	80
2	George Fury	Datsun Stanza SSS	42
3	Ross Dunkerton	Datsun Stanza SSS	35
4	Wayne Bell	Holden Commodore	25
5	Chris Brown	Datsun 180B	24
6	Doug Thompson	Datsun Stanza SSS	23
7	Clive Slater	Toyota Corolla	15
8	Gordon Leven	Datsun Stanza SSS	14
=9	Ed Mulligan	Escort BDA	12
=9	John Berne	Ford Escort BDA	12
11	Murray Coote	Mazda 929	11
=12	Bob Nicoli	Datsun 1600	10
=12	Allan Fitcher	Datsun 1600	10
14	John Atkinson	Datsun Stanza SSS	9
15	Jim Martin	Datsun 1600	8

=== Ross Runnalls – Champion Navigator 1981 ===
Position	Navigator	Car	Points
1	Ross Runnalls	Datsun Stanza SSS	80
2	Monty Suffern	Datsun Stanza SSS	42
3	Jeff Beaumont	Datsun Stanza SSS	35
4	Col Parry	Holden Commodore	25
5	Simon Brown	Datsun 180B	24
6	Ron Lugg	Datsun Stanza SSS	23
7	Rod van der Straaten	Toyota Corolla	15
8	Robert Wilson	Datsun Stanza SSS	14
9	Geoff Jones	Escort BDA	12
10	Brian Marsden	Mazda 929	11
=11	Noel Richards	Ford Escort BDA	10
=11	Peter McNeil	Datsun 1600	10
13	Bob Comley	Datsun 1600	9
=14	Adrian Stafford	Datsun Stanza SSS	8
=14	Peter Garbett	Datsun 1600	8
