= 1978 Australian Rally Championship =

Seasons
- ← 1977 1979 →

The 1978 Australian Rally Championship was a series of six rallying events held across Australia. It was the eleventh season in the history of the competition.

Greg Carr and navigator Fred Gocentas in the Ford Escort RS1800 won the 1978 Championship, finally breaking the dominance of the Datsuns for the past three years.

== Season review ==
The eleventh Australian Rally Championship was held over six events across Australia, the season consisting of two events for New South Wales and one event each for Victoria, Queensland, South Australia and Western Australia. The 1978 season was again a closely fought battle which resulted in a tie at the finish of the last event of the season between the Datsun of Dunkerton and the Escort of Carr. However the championship was awarded to Carr on a countback as he had three wins to Dunkerton's one.

== The Rallies ==
The six events of the 1978 season were as follows.

Round	Rally	Date
1	Rally of the West (WA)	
2	Lutwyche Village Rally (QLD)	
3	Donlee Rally (NSW)	
4	Bega Valley Rally (NSW)	
5	Endrust Forest Rally (SA)	
6	Marchal Rally (VIC)	

=== Round Four – Bega Valley Rally ===
Position	Driver	Navigator	Car	Points
1	Greg Carr	Fred Gocentas	Ford Escort RS1800	40
2	Ross Dunkerton	Jeff Beaumont	Datsun 710 Coupe	42
3	Colin Bond	John Dawson-Damer	Ford Escort RS2000	54
4	Geoff Portman	Ross Runnalls	Datsun 1600	60
5	Murray Coote	Brain Marsden	Datsun 120Y	61
6	Ed Mulligan	M. Rebecchi	Datsun 1600	74

== 1978 Drivers and Navigators Championships ==
Final pointscore for 1978 is as follows.

=== Greg Carr – Champion Driver 1978 ===
Position	Driver	Car	Points
1	Greg Carr	Ford Escort RS1800	
2	Ross Dunkerton	Datsun 710 Coupe	
3	Colin Bond		
4	George Fury		
5	Clive Slater		
6	Geoff Portman	Datsun 1600	

=== John Dawson-Damer – Champion Navigator 1978 ===
Position	Navigator	Car	Points
1	John Dawson-Damer	Ford Escort RS2000	
2	Fred Gocentas	Ford Escort RS1800	
3	Jeff Beaumont	Datsun 710 Coupe	
4	Monty Suffern		
5	Steve Halloran		
6	Ross Runnalls		
