= 1977 Australian Rally Championship =

Seasons
- ← 1976 1978 →

The 1977 Australian Rally Championship was a series of five rallying events held across Australia. It was the tenth season in the history of the competition.

Ross Dunkerton and navigator Jeff Beaumont in the Datsun 260Z tied with George Fury and navigator Monty Suffern in the Datsun 710 Coupe for the 1977 Championship.

== Season review ==
The tenth Australian Rally Championship was held over five events across Australia, the season consisting of one event each for Victoria, Queensland, New South Wales, South Australia and Western Australia. The 1977 season was a closely fought battle between the Datsuns of Dunkerton and Fury and at the end of the season they could not be separated and thus tied for the championship.

== The Rallies ==
The five events of the 1977 season were as follows.

Round	Rally	Date
1	North Eastern Rally (VIC)	
2	Rally of the West (WA)	
3	Lutwyche Village Rally (QLD)	
4	Bega Valley Rally (NSW)	
5	Endrust Forest Rally (SA)	

=== Round Two – Rally of the West ===
Position	Driver	Navigator	Car	Points
1	Ross Dunkerton	Jeff Beaumont	Datsun 260Z	41
2	George Fury	Monty Suffern	Datsun 710 Coupe	52
3	Clive Slater	Andy Van Kann	Toyota Corolla TE27	58
4	Dean Rainsford	Adrian Mortimer	SAAB 99 EMS	71
5	Doug Stewart	Rod Van Der Straaten	Mitsubishi Lancer GSR	82
6	Brian Smallwood	Glen Thorp	Mitsubishi Lancer	95

=== Round Four – Bega Valley Rally ===
Position	Driver	Navigator	Car	Points
1	Greg Carr	Fred Gocentas	Ford Escort RS2000	35
2	George Fury	Monty Suffern	Datsun 710 Coupe	42
3	Darryl Rowney	Robert Wilson	Datsun 1600	43
4	Peter Gaudron	Graeme Pigram	Datsun 1600	44
5	Mark Hankinson	Graham Moule	Datsun 1600	46
6	David Balmain	Terry Hanrahan	Mitsubishi Lancer	52

== 1977 Drivers and Navigators Championships ==
Final pointscore for 1977 is as follows.

=== Ross Dunkerton and George Fury – Champion Drivers 1977 ===
Position	Driver	Car	Points
1=	Ross Dunkerton	Datsun 260Z	
1=	George Fury	Datsun 710 Coupe	
3	Doug Stewart		
4	David Morrow		
5	Greg Carr	Ford Escort RS2000	
6=	Clive Slater		
6=	Bob Riley		

=== Jeff Beaumont and Monty Suffern – Champion Navigators 1977 ===
Position	Navigator	Car	Points
1=	Jeff Beaumont	Datsun 260Z	
1=	Monty Suffern	Datsun 710 Coupe	
3	George Shepheard		
4	Neil Faulkner		
5	Fred Gocentas	Ford Escort RS2000	
6	Brian Hope		
