= 1980 Australian Rally Championship =

Seasons
- ← 1979 1981 →

The 1980 Australian Rally Championship was a series of five rallying events held across Australia. It was the 13th season in the history of the competition.

George Fury and navigator Monty Suffern in the Datsun Stanza won the 1980 Championship.

== Season review ==
The 13th Australian Rally Championship was held over five events across Australia, the season consisting of one event each for New South Wales, Victoria, Queensland, South Australia and Western Australia. The 1980 season saw the Datsun Stanzas dominate the competition, taking out first, third and fourth places in the championship. It was the fifth championship for Datsun in six years, with wins in all five rounds. Colin Bond and John Dawson-Damer put up some opposition in their Ford Escort RS1800 but it was Datsun's and in particular Fury's year.

== The Rallies ==
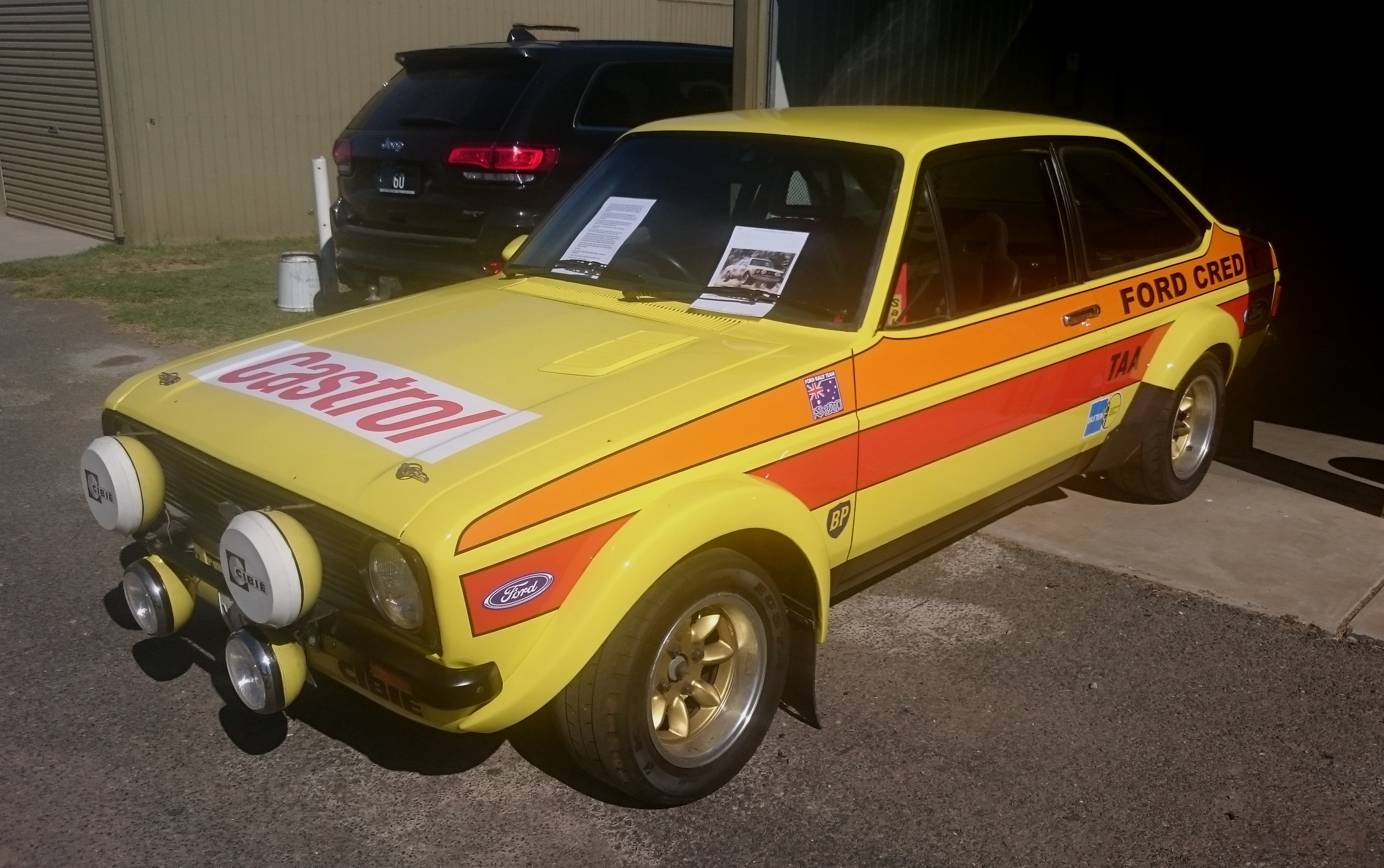
Colin Bond placed second in the Drivers Championship with this Ford Escort RS1800

The five events of the 1980 season were as follows.

Round	Rally	Date
1	Rally of the West (WA)	5–6 April 1980
2	Lutwyche Village Rally (QLD)	3/4 May 1980
3	Akademos Rally (VIC)	24/25 May 1980
4	Bega Valley Rally (NSW)	14–16 June 1980
5	Donlee Rally (SA)	19/20 July 1980

=== Round One – Commonwealth Bank Rally of the West ===
Position	Driver	Navigator	Car	Time
1	George Fury	Monty Suffern	Datsun Stanza	271:22
2	Colin Bond	John Dawson-Damer	Ford Escort RS1800	275:54
3	Clive Slater	Ray Stubbs	Toyota Corolla TE27	292:14
4	Tony Masling	Hope	Datsun Stanza	307:47
5	Peter Flood	John Robinson	Holden Gemini	311:42
6	Frank Johnson	Steve Vanderbyl	Mazda RX4	321:55
7	Chris Hake	Vicky Hake	Datsun 1600	322:24
8	Adrian Stafford	Roger Forestier	Mitsubishi Galant	326:40

=== Round Two – Lutwyche Village Rally ===
Position	Driver	Navigator	Car	Time
1	George Fury	Monty Suffern	Datsun Stanza	236.54
2	Greg Carr	Fred Gocentas	Ford Escort RS1800	238.19
3	Ross Dunkerton	Jeff Beaumont	Datsun Stanza	239.36
4	Colin Bond	John Dawson-Damer	Ford Escort RS1800	244.22
5	Wayne Bell	Dave Boddy	Holden Gemini Turbo	248.12
6	Ed Mulligan	C Heaney	Ford Escort RS1800	250.22
7	Murray Coote	Brian Marsden	Ford Escort RS2000	254.43
8	Ray Vandersee	Ian Young	Datsun 120Y	269.12
9	Barry Ferguson	Steve Owers	Holden Gemini TC	269.49
10	Lisle Neumann	P Young	Datsun 1600	299.45

=== Round Three – Akademos Rally ===
Position	Driver	Navigator	Car	Time
1	Ross Dunkerton	Jeff Beaumont	Datsun Stanza	48.47
2	Colin Bond	John Dawson-Damer	Ford Escort RS1800	55.49
3	Greg Carr	Fred Gocentas	Ford Escort RS1800	62.43
4	Barry Ferguson	Steve Owers	Holden Gemini TC	66.42
5	Chris Brown	Paul Patterson	Datsun 1600	67.53
6	Hugh Bell	Damian O'Reilly	Datsun 1600	71.16

=== Round Four – Bega Valley Rally ===
Position	Driver	Navigator	Car	Time
1	George Fury	Monty Suffern	Datsun Stanza	6:19.43
2	Colin Bond	John Dawson-Damer	Ford Escort RS1800	6:20.20
3	Ross Dunkerton	Jeff Beaumont	Datsun Stanza	6:20.56
4	Geoff Portman	Ross Runnalls	Datsun Stanza	6:31.25
5	Barry Ferguson	Steve Owers	Holden Gemini TC	7:08.52
6	Peter Nelson	Graham Moule	Datsun 1600	7:16.47
7	G Clarke	A Davis	Datsun 180B SSS	7:17.36
8	B Clarke	Mal Sinfield	Datsun 180B SSS	7:18.43
9	P Eather	S Yorke	Datsun 180B SSS	7:20.28
10	D Balmain	B Woolcott	Mitsubishi Lancer	7:21.02

=== Round Five – Donlee Rally ===
Position	Driver	Navigator	Car	Time
1	Geoff Portman	Ross Runnalls	Datsun Stanza	5:53.47
2	Colin Bond	John Dawson-Damer	Ford Escort RS1800	6:01.07
3	George Fury	Monty Suffern	Datsun Stanza	6:05.29
4	Barry Burns	Dave Milne	Datsun 1600	6:36.45
5	Brenton Udy	Mike Ball	Renault 12	6:42.29
6	John Atkinson	Jeff Small	Ford Escort RS2000	7:16.47

== 1980 Drivers and Navigators Championships ==
Final pointscore for 1980 is as follows.

=== George Fury – Champion Driver 1980 ===
Position	Driver	Car	Points
1	George Fury	Datsun Stanza	31
2	Colin Bond	Ford Escort RS1800	27
3	Ross Dunkerton	Datsun Stanza	17
4	Geoff Portman	Datsun Stanza	12
5	Greg Carr	Ford Escort RS1800	10
6	Barry Ferguson	Holden Gemini TC	5

=== Monty Suffern – Champion Navigator 1980 ===
Position	Navigator	Car	Points
1	Monty Suffern	Datsun Stanza	31
2	John Dawson-Damer	Ford Escort RS1800	27
3	Jeff Beaumont	Datsun Stanza	17
4	Ross Runnalls	Datsun Stanza	12
5	Fred Gocentas	Ford Escort RS1800	10
6	Steve Owers	Holden Gemini TC	5
