= 1979 Australian Rally Championship =

Seasons
- ← 1978 1980 →

The 1979 Australian Rally Championship was a series of five rallying events held across Australia. It was the twelfth season in the history of the competition.

Ross Dunkerton and navigator Jeff Beaumont in the Datsun Stanza won the 1979 Championship.

== Season review ==
The twelfth Australian Rally Championship was held over five events across Australia, the season consisting of one event each for New South Wales, Victoria, Queensland, South Australia and Western Australia. The 1979 season saw the Datsun Stanzas of Dunkerton and Fury regain some of their dominance with the main challenge from the Ford Escort of Greg Carr.

== The Rallies ==
The five events of the 1979 season were as follows.

Round	Rally	Date
1	Akademos Rally (VIC)	
2	Rally of the West (WA)	
3	Lutwyche Village Rally (QLD)	
4	Bega Valley Rally (NSW)	
5	Endrust Forest Rally (SA)	

=== Round Four – Bega Valley Rally ===
Position	Driver	Navigator	Car	Points
1	Colin Bond	John Dawson-Damer	Ford Escort RS1800	91.18
2	George Fury	Monty Suffern	Datsun Stanza	97.56
3	Ross Dunkerton	Jeff Beaumont	Datsun Stanza	123.35
4	Peter Gaudron	Graeme Pigram	Datsun 1600	134.50
5	Paul Nudd	Barbara Nudd	Datsun 120Y	142.10
6	Ian Swan	Phillip Rainer	Datsun 120Y	149.17

== 1979 Drivers and Navigators Championships ==
Final pointscore for 1979 is as follows.

=== Ross Dunkerton – Champion Driver 1979 ===
Position	Driver	Car	Points
1	Ross Dunkerton	Datsun Stanza	
2	Greg Carr	Ford Escort RS1800	
3	Colin Bond	Ford Escort RS1800	
4	Geoff Portman		
5	George Fury	Datsun Stanza	
6	Dean Rainsford		

=== Jeff Beaumont – Champion Navigator 1979 ===
Position	Navigator	Car	Points
1	Jeff Beaumont	Datsun Stanza	
2	Fred Gocentas	Ford Escort RS1800	
3	John Dawson-Damer	Ford Escort RS1800	
4	Ross Runnalls		
5	Monty Suffern	Datsun Stanza	
6	Jerry Browne		
