= 1987 Australian Rally Championship =

Seasons
- ← 1986 1988 →

1987 Australian Rally Championship was the 20th season of the Australian Rally Championship. The drivers' championship was won by Greg Carr driving an Alfa Romeo GTV-6, with the navigators' championship going to Carr's navigator in five of the six events, Fred Gocentas. Carr was the only driver to finish every rally.

== Calendar ==
Round	Date	Rally	State
1	3–5 April	Advocate-APPM International Rally of Tasmania	Tasmania
2	9–10 May	GWN Forest Rally	Western Australia
3	6–7 June	Bega Valley Rally	New South Wales
4	27–28 June	Keema Classic Rally	Queensland
5	17–18 October	Tile Supplies Rally	South Australia
6	21–22 November	Alpine Rally	Victoria

== Results ==
=== Rallies ===
Round	Rally	Winning driver	Winning Navigator	Winning car
1	Rally of Tasmania	Wayne Bell	Peter Clark	Toyota Corolla
2	Forest Rally	Ross Dunkerton	Steve McKimmie	Subaru RX Turbo
3	Bega Valley Rally	David Eadie	Chris Shearer	Mazda Familia 4WD
4	Keema Classic Rally	Greg Carr	Fred Gocentas	Alfa Romeo GTV-6
5	Tile Supplies Rally	Wayne Bell	David Boddy	Mazda Familia 4WD
6	Alpine Rally	Ian Hill	Phillip Bonser	Subaru RX Turbo

=== Championship points ===
Only the top five are shown.

==== Drivers' Championship ====
Position	Driver	Points
1	Greg Carr	84
2	Wayne Bell	75
3	Ed Ordinski	47
4	Ian Hill	40
5	David Eadie	26

==== Navigator' Championship ====
Position	Navigator	Points
1	Fred Gocentas	74
2	David Boddy	55
3	Greg Preece	44
4	Phillip Bonser	40
5	Jeff Jones	26
