= 1975 Australian Rally Championship =

Seasons
- ← 1974 1976 →

The 1975 Australian Rally Championship was a series of seven rallying events held across Australia. It was the eighth season in the history of the competition.

Ross Dunkerton and navigator John Large in the Datsun 240Z were the winners of the 1975 Championship.

== Season review ==
The eighth Australian Rally Championship was once again held over seven events across Australia. This season consisted of two events each for Victoria and New South Wales, and one each in Queensland, South Australia and Western Australia. The 1975 season saw domination of the Datsun 240Z's, with Dunkerton and Large winning convincingly (three wins, two seconds and a third) from McLeod and Mortimer.

== The Rallies ==
The seven events of the 1975 season were as follows.

Round	Rally	Date
1	Mazda House 1000 Rally (NSW)	
2	Toms Tyres 1600 Rally (WA)	
3	Akademos Rally (VIC)	
4	Bega Valley Rally (NSW)	
5	Warana Rally (QLD)	
6	Walker Trophy Rally (SA)	
7	Alpine Rally (VIC)	

=== Round One – Mazda House 1000 Rally ===
Position	Driver	Navigator	Car	Points
1	George Fury	Roger Bonhomme	Datsun 710	34
=2	Ross Dunkerton	John Large	Datsun 260Z	39
=2	Doug Stewart	Brian Hope	Mitsubishi Lancer GSR	39
4	Adrian Taylor	John Suominen	Honda Civic	49
5	Stewart McLeod	Adrian Mortimer	Datsun 260Z	51
6	Dean Rainsford	Graham West	Porsche 911	64

=== Round Two – Toms Tyres 1600 Rally ===
Position	Driver	Navigator	Car	Points
1	Ross Dunkerton	John Large	Datsun 260Z	44
2	John Edwards	Bill Philip	Datsun 260Z	63
3	Stewart McLeod	Adrian Mortimer	Datsun 260Z	64
4	Ed Mulligan	George Shepheard	Holden Torana L34	67
5	John Neal	Dave Manners	Torana GTR XU-1	92
6	Alan Stean	Lyn Mathews	Datsun 240Z	104

=== Round Three – Akademos Rally ===
=1	Ross Dunkerton	John Large	Datsun 260Z	48
=1	Stewart McLeod	Adrian Mortimer	Datsun 260Z	48
3	George Fury	Monty Suffern	Datsun 710	55
4	Colin Bond	George Shepheard	Holden Torana L34	61
5	Doug Stewart	Lindsay Adcock	Mitsubishi Lancer GSR	64
6	Dean Rainsford	Bernie Peasley	Porsche 911	77

=== Round Four – Bega Valley Rally ===
Position	Driver	Navigator	Car	Points
1	Colin Bond	George Shepheard	Holden Torana L34	65
2	Robert Jackson	Ross Jackson	Torana GTR XU-1	77
3	Ross Dunkerton	John Large	Datsun 260Z	87
4	Ed Mulligan	Fred Gocentas	Holden Torana L34	88
5	David Jones	Ian Baldock	Mitsubishi Galant	97
6	Barry Dyer	Brian McGuirk	Subaru Coupe	145

=== Round Five – Warana Rally ===
1	Ross Dunkerton	John Large	Datsun 260Z	49
2	Stewart McLeod	Adrian Mortimer	Datsun 260Z	50
3	Ed Mulligan	Fred Gocentas	Holden Torana L34	52
4	Alan Hall	Bruce Mallett	Mazda RX-3	83
5	David Jones	Ian Baldock	Mitsubishi Galant	86
6	Peter Wickham	Darryl Kelly	Torana GTR XU-1	100

=== Round Six – Walker Trophy Rally ===
1	Dean Rainsford	Graham West	Porsche 911	45
2	Ross Dunkerton	John Large	Datsun 260Z	45.75
3	Stewart McLeod	Adrian Mortimer	Datsun 260Z	50.25
4	Bob Pike	Graham Middleton	Datsun 260Z	59.5
5	Jim Conaghty	Kevin Attwood	Mazda RX-3	72.25
6	Dieter Thumm	Barry Walmsley	Ford Escort RS2000	72.5

=== Round Seven – Alpine Rally ===
1	Stewart McLeod	Adrian Mortimer	Datsun 260Z	121
2	David Bond	Ian Richards	Mitsubishi Lancer	143
3	Murray Coote	Rod Browning	Datsun 1200	148
4	Roger Jackson	Fred Gocentas	Torana GTR XU-1	159
5	Garry Harrowfield	Trevor Boyd	Datsun 1600	
6	David Jones	Ian Baldock	Mitsubishi Galant	215

== 1975 Drivers and Navigators Championships ==
Final pointscore for 1975 is as follows.

=== Ross Dunkerton – Champion Driver 1975 ===
Position	Driver	Car	Points
1	Ross Dunkerton	Datsun 240Z	37.5
2	Stewart McLeod	Datsun 240Z	30.5
3	George Fury	Datsun 710	13
4	Colin Bond	Holden Torana L34	12
5=	Ed Mulligan	Holden Torana L34	10
5=	Dean Rainsford	Porsche 911	10

=== John Large – Champion Navigator 1975 ===
Position	Navigator	Car	Points
1	John Large	Datsun 240Z	37.5
2	Adrian Mortimer	Datsun 240Z	30.5
3	George Shepheard	Holden Torana L34	13
4=	Fred Gocentas	Holden Torana L34	10
4=	Graham West	Porsche 911	10
6	Roger Bonhomme	Datsun	9
