= 1984 Australian Rally Championship =

Organized rally competition in Australia

Seasons
- ← 1983 1985 →

The 1984 Australian Rally Championship was a series of six rallying events held across Australia. It was the 17th season in the history of the competition.

David Officer and navigator Kate Officer in the Mitsubishi Galant won the 1984 Championship, becoming the first husband and wife team to win the championship.

== Season review ==
The 17th Australian Rally Championship was held over six events across Australia, the season consisting of one event each for Queensland and Western Australia and two each for New South Wales and Victoria. It was an unusual season, with very little manufacturer backing and a mix of classes with the introduction of the Production Rally Car category.

== The Rallies ==
The six events of the 1984 season were as follows.

Round	Rally	Date
1	The Canon Zodiac Rally (VIC)	24–25 March 1984
2	Mid-State Television Rally (NSW)	7–8 April 1984
3	James Hardie National Rally (QLD)	5–6 May 1984
4	The Sunday Times Safari (WA)	2–3 June 1984
5	Dunlop 2GO Rally (NSW)	11–12 August 1984
6	Enka-Fill Alpine Rally (VIC)	24–25 November 1984

=== Round One – The Canon Zodiac Rally ===
Position	Driver	Navigator	Car	Penalties
1	David Officer	Kate Hobson	Mitsubishi Galant	4:34.14
2	Chris Brown	Noel Richards	Datsun 180B	4:39.49
3	Peter Clarke	Mick Harker	Datsun Stanza	4:42.00
4	John Atkinson	Stephen Robertson	Datsun Stanza	4:44.14
=4	Murray Coote	Iain Stewart	Datsun 120Y	4:44.14
6	Phil Horan	Adrian Ward	Datsun Stanza	4:52.16

Production Rally Cars

Position	Driver	Navigator	Car	Penalties
1	Ed Mulligan	Geoff Jones	Mazda RX-7	5:05.55
2	Caroline O’Shanesy	Meg Davis	Fiat Superbrava	5:19.40
3	Terry Kuss	Bob Durrant	Mitsubishi Starion	5:38.40

=== Round Two – Mid-State Television Rally ===
Position	Driver	Navigator	Car	Penalties
1	Greg Carr	Fred Gocentas	Fiat 131 Abarth	242.38
2	Ian Hill	Phil Bonser	Ford Escort	246.06
3	Geoff Portman	Ross Runnalls	Datsun Bluebird	248.31
4	Murray Coote	Iain Stewart	Datsun 120Y	251.10
5	Peter Glennie	Brian Smith	Datsun Stanza	255.16
6	Brian Smith	Peter Mignot	Mitsubishi Galant	256.21

Production Rally Cars

Position	Driver	Navigator	Car	Penalties
1	Ed Mulligan	Geoff Jones	Mazda RX-7	274.33
2	Jim Middleton	Garry Marshall	Holden Commodore	283.56
3	Rob Worboys	Bob Carpenter	Ford Laser	287.50

=== Round Three – James Hardie National Rally ===
Position	Driver	Navigator	Car	Penalties
1	Greg Carr	Fred Gocentas	Fiat 131 Abarth	254.12
2	David Officer	Kate Hobson	Mitsubishi Galant	261.57
3	Murray Coote	Iain Stewart	Datsun 120Y	262.56
4	Peter Clark	Mick Harker	Datsun Stanza	268.35
5	Jack Wightman	Jon Thompson	Datsun	279.56
6	Robert Bell	Ray Temple	Ford Escort	282.22

Production Rally Cars

Position	Driver	Navigator	Car	Penalties
1	Ed Mulligan	Geoff Jones	Mazda RX-7	283.39
2	Jim Middleton	Peter Young	Holden Commodore	284.07
3	Rob Worboys	Bob Carpenter	Ford Laser	285.57

=== Round Four – Sunday Times Safari ===
Position	Driver	Navigator	Car	Penalties
1	Bob Nicoli	Peter Macneall	Datsun Stanza	237.07
2	Clive Slater	Rod Van Der Straaten	Toyota Corolla	239.50
3	David Officer	Kate Hobson	Mitsubishi Galant	241.28
4	Rolly Waters	Geoff Mills	Ford Escort	249.29
5	Adrian Stafford	Roger Forester	Toyota Corolla	250.02
6	Mark Anderson	Peter Baesjov	Datsun	256.34

Production Rally Cars

Position	Driver	Navigator	Car	Penalties
1	Greg Carr	Fred Gocentas	Holden Commodore	267.04
2	Ed Mulligan	Geoff Jones	Mazda RX-7	272.24

=== Round Five – Dunlop 2GO Rally ===
Position	Driver	Navigator	Car	Penalties
1	Ian Hill	Phillip Bonser	Ford Escort RS1800	7h 27.31
2	David Officer	Kate Hobson	Mitsubishi Galant	7h 32.25
3	Ross Dunkerton	Steve McKinnie	Datsun 1600	7h 36.32
4	Murray Coote	Iain Stewart	Datsun 1200	7h 36.52
5	Rod Cremen	Ray Temple	Toyota Corolla	7h 51.19
6	Greg Carr	Fred Gocentas	Fiat 131 Abarth	7h 53.02

Production Rally Cars

Position	Driver	Navigator	Car	Penalties
1	N Hotta	S Inada	Toyota Sprinter	7h 43.03
2	Wayne Bell	Dave Boddy	Fiat Superbrava	8h 13.22
3	Ed Mulligan	Geoff Jones	Mazda RX-7	8h 20.18

=== Round Six – Enka-Fill Alpine Rally ===
Position	Driver	Navigator	Car	Penalties
1	David Officer	Kate Officer	Mitsubishi Galant	5:36.12
2	George Fury	Monty Suffern	Datsun 120Y	5:37.11
3	Murray Coote	Iain Stewart	Datsun 1200	5:45.38
4	Barry Lowe	Ted Dobrzynski	Dazda Rally	5:48.52
5	Peter Glennie	Brian Smith	Datsun 200B	5:53.55
6	David Jones	Peter Curtain	Holden Commodore	5:54.36

Production Rally Cars

Position	Driver	Navigator	Car	Penalties
1	Jim Middleton	Garry Marshall	Holden Commodore	6:05.55
2	Ed Mulligan	Geoff Jones	Mazda RX-7	6:09.45
3	Terry Kuss	Bob Durrant	Mitsubishi Starion	6:24.43

== 1984 Drivers and Navigators Championships ==
Final pointscore for 1984 is as follows.

=== David Officer – Champion Driver 1984 ===
Position	Driver	Car	Points
1	David Officer	Mitsubishi Galant	
2	Ed Mulligan	Mazda RX-7	
3	Greg Carr	Fiat 131 Abarth	
4	Murray Coote	Datsun 1200	
5	Jim Middleton	Holden Commodore	
6	Ian Hill	Ford Escort BDA	

=== Kate Officer – Champion Navigator 1984 ===
Position	Navigator	Car	Points
1	Kate Officer	Mitsubishi Galant	
2	Geoff Jones	Mazda RX-7	
3	Fred Gocentas	Fiat 131 Abarth	
4	Iain Stewart	Datsun 1200	
5	Phillip Bonser	Ford Escort BDA	
6	Gary Marshall Jnr	Holden Commodore	
