= 1986 Australian Rally Championship =

Seasons
- ← 1985 1987 →

The 1986 Australian Rally Championship was a series of six rallying events held across Australia. It was the 19th season in the history of the competition.

Barry Lowe in the Subaru RX Turbo won the 1986 Driver's Championship. Kate Officer took out the Navigator's championship. Lowe's navigator Mark Stacey placed second as he didn't compete in the opening round.

== Season review ==
The 19th Australian Rally Championship was held over six events across Australia, the season consisting of one event each for New South Wales, Victoria, Queensland, South Australia, Tasmania and West Australia. The 1986 season saw Barry Lowe silence his critics by winning the ARC title for the second year in a row. It was the last season for the Group G contenders, as the 1987 championship would only be open to Group A cars. Group A cars dominated the season accounting for wins in four of the six events. Lowe only had one outright win for the season, but his consistent high placings saw him victorious at season's end.

== The Rallies ==
The six events of the 1986 season were as follows.

Round	Rally	Date
1	The Advocate – Fairfield Stages Rally (TAS)	5–6 April 1986
2	The Forest Rally (WA)	10–11 May 1986
3	Bega Rally of the Valley (NSW)	7–8 June 1986
4	The Keema Classic Rally (QLD)	18–19 July 1986
5	The Tile Supplies Rally (SA)	18–19 October 1986
6	BP Visco Bright Alpine Rally (VIC)	22–23 November 1986

=== Round One – The Advocate – Fairfield Stages Rally ===
Position	Driver	Navigator	Car	Penalties
1	Peter Glennie	Coral Taylor	Datsun	264.14
2	David Officer	Kate Officer	Mitsubishi Starion	264.34
3	Barry Lowe	Kevin Pedder	Subaru RX Turbo	268.52
4	Graham Alexander	Graham Sedgwick	Toyota Corolla GT	271.22
5	Phil Reader	Rod Coenan	Mazda RX-4	275.02
6	Balt Vandenberg	Bill Worsley	Datsun 1600	275.24
7	Philip Smith	John Howard	Datsun 1600	277.25
8	Graeme Walkem	Bill Cromarty	Mazda RX-7	281.21
9	John Brock	Greg Preece	Subaru RX Turbo	281.53
10	Jon Waterhouse	Russ Witty	Mazda RX-7	284.07

=== Round Two – The Forest Rally ===
Position	Driver	Navigator	Car	Penalties
1	Wayne Bell	Dave Boddy	Toyota Corolla GT	243.10
2	Peter Clark	Wayne Kenny	Subaru RX Turbo	244.33
3	Barry Lowe	Mark Stacey	Subaru RX Turbo	247.28
4	John Atkinson	Jim Gleeson	Subaru RX Turbo	247.45
5	John Macara	Rod van der Straaten	Toyota Corolla GT	248.08
6	Greg Carr	Fred Gocentas	Alfa Romeo GTV6	249.57
7	Peter Myers	Keith Moyes	Toyota Corolla GT	253.59
8	David Officer	Kate Officer	Mitsubishi Starion	254.28
9	Jim Marden	Alan Stafford	Toyota Corolla GT	254.46
10	Clive Slater	Steve Owers	Mitsubishi Galant	257.54

=== Round Three – Bega Rally of the Valley ===
Position	Driver	Navigator	Car	Penalties
1	Dave Eadie	Chris Shearer	Datsun 1600	223.56
2	Ron McKinnon	Steve Owers	Datsun 1600	223.59
3	Greg Carr	Fred Gocentas	Alfa Romeo GTV6	224.53
4	David Officer	Kate Officer	Mitsubishi Starion	226.05
5	John Atkinson	Jim Gleeson	Subaru RX Turbo	226.19
6	Barry Lowe	Mark Stacey	Subaru RX Turbo	229.28
7	Peter Glennie	Coral Taylor	Subaru RX Turbo	229.48
8	Andrew Murfett	Tony Jackson	Mazda RX-2	230.45
9	Arthur Jackson	Roger Mail	Datsun 1600	232.53
10	Hannu Ropolla	Geoff Jones	Datsun 1600	233.27

=== Round Four – The Keema Classic Rally ===
Position	Driver	Navigator	Car	Penalties
1	Andrew Murfett	Tony Jackson	Mazda 323 4WD	177.26
2	Barry Lowe	Mark Stacey	Subaru RX Turbo	177.50
3	Murray Coote	Ian Stewart	Mazda 323 4WD	178.50
4	Peter Glennie	Coral Taylor	Subaru RX Turbo	179.11
5	Peter Marcovich	Greg Weale	Subaru RX Turbo	187.13
6	David Officer	Kate Officer	Mitsubishi Starion	187.47
7	John Atkinson	Jim Gleeson	Subaru RX Turbo	189.23
8	Greg Batts	Rob Kimmons	Holden Gemini	194.05
9	Glenn Sommerville	Martin Darch	Datsun 1600	194.36
10	Doug Stewart	Wayne Stewart	Toyota Corolla GT	198.00

=== Round Five – The Tile Supplies Australia Rally ===
Position	Driver	Navigator	Car	Penalties
1	Barry Lowe	Mark Stacey	Subaru RX Turbo	1:36.11
2	Andrew Murfett	Tony Jackson	Mazda 323 4WD	1:36.17
3	David Officer	Kate Officer	Mitsubishi Starion	1:37.12
4	Mark Tolcher	David Tolcher	Subaru RX Turbo	1:38.48
5	Peter Glennie	Coral Taylor	Subaru RX Turbo	1:43.37
6	Ed Ordynski	Lynn Wilson	Subaru RX Turbo	1:48.50

=== Round Six – BP Visco Bright Alpine Rally ===
Position	Driver	Navigator	Car	Penalties
1	David Officer	Kate Officer	Mitsubishi Starion	6:36.06
2	Murray Coote	Ian Stewart	Mazda 323 4WD	6:40.50
3	Peter Clark	Wayne Kenny	Subaru RX Turbo	6:42.46
4	Neil Bates	David Jorgensen	Datsun 1600	6:44.14
5	Geoff Portman	Ross Runnalls	Datsun 1600	6:47.30
6	Greg Brown	Arthur Davis	Datsun 1600	6:48.27
7	Barry Lowe	Mark Stacey	Subaru RX Turbo	6:50.05
8	Mark Tolcher	David Tolcher	Subaru RX Turbo	6:52.13
9	Leslie Adams	Ian Enders	Datsun 1600	6:53.38
10	Paul Bramble	Barrie Nicholl	Holden Commodore V8	6:55.33

== 1986 Drivers and Navigators championships ==
Final pointscore for 1986 is as follows.

=== Barry Lowe – Champion Driver 1986 ===
Position	Driver	Car	Points
1	Barry Lowe	Subaru RX Turbo	83
2	David Officer	Mitsubishi Starion	66
3	Andrew Murfett	Mazda 323 4WD	64
4	Peter Glennie	Subaru RX Turbo	49
5	Greg Carr	Alfa Romeo GTV6	30

=== Kate Officer – Champion Navigator 1986 ===
Position	Navigator	Car	Points
1	Kate Officer	Mitsubishi Starion	67
2	Mark Stacey	Subaru RX Turbo	66
3	Tony Jackson	Mazda 323 4WD	64
4	Coral Taylor	Subaru RX Turbo	49
=5	Fred Gocentas	Alfa Romeo GTV6	30
=5	Steve Owers	Datsun 1600	30
