= 1983 Australian Rally Championship =

Series of rally events in Australia

Seasons
- ← 1982 1984 →

The 1983 Australian Rally Championship was a series of four rallying events held across Australia. It was the 16th season in the history of the competition.

Ross Dunkerton won the 1983 Drivers Championship and Geoff Jones took out the navigators honours for the year.

== Season review ==
The 16th Australian Rally Championship was held over four events across Australia, the season consisting of one event each for Queensland, Victoria, New South Wales and Western Australia. With the series being reduced to four events for the year, the field split between two categories with the introduction of Group A cars and the lack of any factory backed teams, things did not look promising. This was compounded when the second round in Queensland was postponed twice due to inclement weather. However it was an interesting and hard fought season with Dunkerton taking out his fifth title and using three different cars and two navigators to do so. The navigator's title went to Geoff Jones who was with runner up to the driver's title Peter Johnson for all four events.

== The Rallies ==
The five events of the 1983 season were as follows.

Round	Rally	Date
1	The Sunday Times Safari (WA)	4–5 June 1983
2	The James Hardie National Rally (QLD)	16–17 July 1983
3	Dunlop 2GO Rally (NSW)	13–14 August 1983
4	The Enka-Fill Alpine Rally (VIC)	19–20 November 1983

=== Round One – The Sunday Times Safari ===
Position	Driver	Navigator	Car	Penalties
1	Greg Carr	Fred Gocentas	Fiat 131 Abarth	219.37
2	John Macara	David Hatley	Datsun 1600	228.31
=3	Ross Dunkerton	Steve McKimmie	Datsun 1600	229.05
=3	David Officer	Kate Hobson	Mitsubishi Galant	229.05
5	Ken Joss	Leo Iriks	Datsun 1600	234.08
6	Peter Thompson	Simon Scott	Datsun Stanza	243.33

Group A

Position	Driver	Navigator	Car	Penalties
1	Chris Brown	Noel Richards	Holden Commodore SS	251.48
2	Caroline O’Shannesy	Jill Davies	Fiat 131 Superbrava	322.05

=== Round Two – The James Hardie National Rally ===
Position	Driver	Navigator	Car	Penalties
1	Ross Dunkerton	David Kortlang	Datsun Stanza	206.38
2	Peter Glennie	Brian Smith	Datsun 200B	209.24
3	David Officer	Kate Hobson	Mitsubishi Galant	211.22
4	Peter Thompson	Simon Scott	Datsun Stanza	216.53
5	Murray Coote	Brian Marsden	Datsun 1200	218.03
6	Wayne Bell	Dave Boddy	Toyota T18	221.02

Group A

Position	Driver	Navigator	Car	Penalties
1	Peter Johnson	Geoff Jones	Mazda RX-7	
2	Peter Lockhart	John Hall	Isuzu Gemini PF50	

=== Round Three – The Dunlop 2GO Rally ===
Position	Driver	Navigator	Car	Penalties
1	Ian Hill	Phil Bonser	Ford Escort RS	181.18
2	Murray Coote	Brian Marsden	Datsun 1200	181.40
3	David Officer	Kate Hobson	Mitsubishi Galant	182.18
4	Graham Wise	John Williams	Datsun 1600	184.18
5	Clive Slater	Alan Stafford	Toyota Celica	184.23
6	Ron Cremmen	M Verrall	Datsun Stanza	184.45

Group A

Position	Driver	Navigator	Car	Penalties
1	Peter Johnson	Geoff Jones	Mazda RX-7	198.36
2	Russell Worthington	Simon Kabel	Mazda 626	199.30

=== Round Four – The Enka-Fill Alpine Rally ===
Position	Driver	Navigator	Car	Penalties
1	Ian Hill	Phil Bonser	Ford Escort RS	4:04.57
2	Hugh Bell	Paul Paterson	Datsun 1600 "Dazda"	4:05.06
3	David Officer	Kate Hobson	Mitsubishi Galant	4:06.46
4	Clive Slater	Steve Owers	Toyota Celica	4:12.42
5	John Berne	Bruce Fullerton	Ford Escort RS	4:14.39
6	Chris Wall	Jim Maude	Datsun 1600	4:14.46
7	Rod Jones	Mark Blume	Datsun 1600	4:15.39
8	Peter Glover	David Burns	Ford Escort	4:16.13
9	Steve Ashton	Bernard Peasley	Datsun 1600	4:16.28
10	Barry Lowe	Ted Dobrzynski	Datsun 1600 "Dazda"	4:18.09

== 1983 Drivers and Navigators Championships ==
Final pointscore for 1983 is as follows.

=== Ross Dunkerton – Champion Driver 1983 ===
Position	Driver	Car	Points
1	Ross Dunkerton	Datsun 1600; Datsun Stanza; Holden Commodore	56.5
2	Peter Johnson	Mazda RX-7	55
3	David Officer	Mitsubishi Galant	54.5
4	Ian Hill	Ford Escort	48
5	Russell Worthington	Mazda 626	39
6	Caroline O'Shannesy	Fiat 131 Superbrava	35
7	Murray Coote	Datsun 1200	26
8	Greg Carr	Fiat 131 Abarth	24
9	Peter Lockhart	Isuzu Gemini	23
10	Chris Browne	Holden Commodore	20

=== Geoff Jones – Champion Navigator 1983 ===
Position	Navigator	Car	Points
1	Geoff Jones	(with Johnson)	55
2	Kate Hobson	(with Officer)	54 1/2
3	Phil Bonser	(with Hill)	48
4	David Kortlang	(with Dunkerton)	44
5	Gary Kabel	(with Worthington)	39
6	Meg Davis	(with O'Shannesy)	35
7	Brian Marsden	(with Coote)	26
8	Fred Gocentas	(with Carr)	24
9	Stephen Treadwell	(with Lockhart)	23
10	Noel Richards	(with Brown)	20
