= 1989 Australian Rally Championship =

Seasons
- ← 1988 1990 →

The 1989 Australian Rally Championship was a series of six rallying events held across Australia. It was the 22nd season in the history of the competition.

Greg Carr and navigator Mick Harker in a Lancia Delta Integrale won the 1989 Championship convincingly, with a record setting five wins from the six starts, giving Carr his third Australian Rally Championship title. Murray Coote and Iain Stewart in the Mazda 323 4WD were consistently in the placings and finished the season on 81 points compared to Carr's 115. Ross Dunkerton and Fred Gocentas in the Mitsubishi Galant VR-4 were the only other team to win an event, the final round in the ACT.

== Season review ==
The 22nd Australian Rally Championship was held over six events across Australia, the season consisting of one event each for Tasmania, Victoria, Western Australia, South Australia, Queensland and Australian Capital Territory.

== The Rallies ==
The six events of the 1989 season were as follows.

Round	Rally	Date
1	Rally Tasmania	1–2 April 1989
2	BP Alpine Rally (VIC)	29–30 April 1989
3	Forest Rally (WA)	3–4 June 1989
4	Festival State Rally (SA)	1–2 July 1989
5	Rally Queensland	14–15 October 1989
6	Esanda Rally (ACT)	16–18 November 1989

=== Round One – Rally Tasmania ===
Position	Driver	Navigator	Car	Time
1	Greg Carr	Mick Harker	Lancia Delta Integrale	4h 13m 34s
2	Wayne Bell	Dave Boddy	Mazda 323 4WD	4h 17m 25s
3	Murray Coote	Iain Stewart	Mazda 323 4WD	4h 17m 47s
4	Mark Tolcher	David Tolcher	Subaru RX Turbo	4h 25m 57s
5	Peter Glennie	Peter Clark	Subaru RX Turbo	4h 33m 16s
6	Jon Waterhouse	Russ Witty	Mazda RX-7	4h 36m 44s
7	Jim Middleton	Dale Payne	Holden Commodore V8	4h 38m 17s
8	Geoff Keys	Bill Thurley	Mazda 323 4WD	4h 38m 19s
9	Adrian Taylor	Dave Ambrose	Ford Sierra XR 4x4	4h 40m 04s
10	Graham Alexander	John Woodbury	Toyota Corolla GT	4h 41m 23s

=== Round Two – BP Alpine Rally ===
Position	Driver	Navigator	Car	Time
1	Greg Carr	Mick Harker	Lancia Delta Integrale	5h 43m 09s
2	Murray Coote	Iain Stewart	Mazda 323 4WD	5h 46m 55s
3	Ed Ordynski	Lyn Wilson	Mitsubishi Galant VR-4	6h 02m 54s
4	Pat Barber	Jim Maude	Ford Laser TX3 4WD	6h 08m 21s
5	George Kahler	Tony Best	Mazda 323 4WD	6h 08m 45s
6	Peter Glennie	Peter Clark	Subaru RX Turbo	6h 08m 50s
7	Jon Waterhouse	Russ Witty	Mazda RX-7	6h 10m 15s
8	Geoff Keys	Bill Thurley	Mazda 323 4WD	6h 14m 11s
9	Dean Nixon	Trevor Nixon	Subaru RX Turbo	6h 16m 30s
10	Bruce Robertson	Ian Enders	Mazda 323 4WD	6h 18m 36s

=== Round Three – BP Forest Rally ===
Position	Driver	Navigator	Car	Time
1	Greg Carr	Mick Harker	Lancia Delta Integrale	3h 35m 42s
2	Murray Coote	Iain Stewart	Mazda 323 4WD	3h 39m 03s
3	Ed Ordynski	Lyn Wilson	Mitsubishi Galant VR-4	3h 41m 38s
4	John Macara	Leo Eriks	Subaru RX Turbo	3h 44m 02s
5	Adrian Taylor	Dave Ambrose	Ford Sierra XR 4x4	3h 50m 07s
6	Frank Johnson	Rod VanDerStraaten	Mazda 323 4WD	3h 50m 24s
7	George Kahler	Tony Best	Mazda 323 4WD	3h 52m 23s
8	Geoff Keys	Bill Thurley	Mazda 323 4WD	3h 53m 41s
9	Tolly Challis	Reg McKinley	Mazda 323 4WD	3h 54m 32s
10	David Johanson	Dale Hynes	Nissan Gazelle	4h 02m 09s

=== Round Four – Festival State Rally ===
Position	Driver	Navigator	Car	Time
1	Greg Carr	Mick Harker	Lancia Delta Integrale	2h 07m 20s
2	Ed Ordynski	Lyn Wilson	Mitsubishi Galant VR-4	2h 09m 40s
3	Murray Coote	Iain Stewart	Mazda 323 4WD	2h 11m 23s
4	David Eadie	Chris Shearer	Mazda 323 4WD	2h 18m 09s
5	George Kahler	Tony Best	Mazda 323 4WD	2h 18m 20s
6	Geoff Keys	Bill Thurley	Mazda 323 4WD	2h 21m 20s
7	Bruce Robertson	Ian Enders	Mazda 323 4WD	2h 25m 42s
8	John Long	Damien Long	Holden Commodore V8	2h 26m 14s
9	Steve Winwood	Rod Winfield	Holden Commodore V8	2h 28m 46s
10	Denise Collins	Doug Morrison	Mitsubishi Starion	2h 29m 29s

=== Round Five – Caltex CXT Rally Queensland ===
Position	Driver	Navigator	Car	Time
1	Greg Carr	Mick Harker	Lancia Delta Integrale	4h 12m 12s
2	Murray Coote	Iain Stewart	Mazda 323 4WD	4h 15m 34s
3	George Kahler	Tony Best	Mazda 323 4WD	4h 33m 19s
4	Ian Reddiex	Ross Perry	Peugeot 205 GTi	4h 43m 48s
5	Jon Waterhouse	Russ Witty	Mazda RX-7	4h 44m 46s
6	John Goasdoue		Ford Escort	
7	Greg Summerville	David Underwood	Subaru RX Turbo	4h 51m 03s
8	Pat Roberts	Steven Green	Daihatsu Charade Turbo	4h 52m 56s
9	Tony Kabel	Del Garbett	Mazda RX-7	4h 54m 39s
10	Peter Carruthers	Gary Proffit	Mitsubishi Lancer	4h 55m 14s

=== Round Six – Esanda Finance Rally ===
Position	Driver	Navigator	Car	Time
1	Ross Dunkerton	Fred Gocentas	Mitsubishi Galant VR-4 RS	3h 40m 08s
2	Greg Carr	Mick Harker	Lancia Delta Integrale	3h 42m 34s
3	Murray Coote	Iain Stewart	Mazda 323 4WD	3h 47m 18s
4	Ray Wilson	Jeff Grove	Mazda 323 4WD	3h 49m 28s
5	Steve Ashton	Rosemary Nixon	Mitsubishi Galant VR-4 RS	3h 58m 34s
6	Neil Bates	Dave Jorgensen	Subaru RX Turbo	3h 59m 28s
7	George Kahler	Tony Best	Mazda 323 4WD	4h 04m 37s
8	Peter Glennie	Peter Clark	Subaru RX Turbo	4h 05m 30s
9	Barrie Smith	Ray Winwood-Smith	Datsun 280Z	4h 06m 10s
10	Bruce Robertson	Ian Enders	Mazda 323 4WD	4h 09m 48s

== 1989 Drivers and Navigators Championships ==
Final pointscore for 1989 is as follows.

=== Greg Carr – Champion Driver 1989 ===
Position	Driver	Car	Points
1	Greg Carr	Lancia Delta Integrale	115
2	Murray Coote	Mazda 323 4WD	81
3	Ed Ordynski	Mitsubishi Galant VR-4	39
4	George Kahler	Mazda 323 4WD	36
5	Ross Dunkerton	Mitsubishi Galant VR-4 RS	20
6	Jon Waterhouse	Mazda RX-7	18
7	Peter Glennie	Subaru RX Turbo	17
=8	Wayne Bell	Mazda 323 4WD	15
=8	Geoff Keys	Mazda 323 4WD	15
=10	Adrian Taylor	Ford Sierra XR 4x4	10
=10	Mark Tolcher	Subaru RX Turbo	10
=10	Pat Barber	Ford Laser TX3 4WD	10
=10	John Macara	Subaru RX Turbo	10
=10	David Eadie	Mazda 323 4WD	10
=10	Ian Reddiex	Peugeot 205 GTi	10
=10	Ray Wilson	Mazda 323 4WD	10

=== Mick Harker – Champion Navigator 1989 ===
Position	Navigator	Car	Points
1	Mick Harker	Lancia Delta Integrale	115
2	Iain Stewart	Mazda 323 4WD	81
3	Lyn Wilson	Mitsubishi Galant VR-4	39
4	Tony Best	Mazda 323 4WD	36
5	Fred Gocentas	Mitsubishi Galant VR-4 RS	20
6	Russ Witty	Mazda RX-7	18
7	Peter Clark	Subaru RX Turbo	17
=8	Dave Boddy	Mazda 323 4WD	15
=8	Bill Thurley	Mazda 323 4WD	15
=10	Dave Ambrose	Ford Sierra XR 4x4	10
=10	David Tolcher	Subaru RX Turbo	10
=10	Jim Maude	Ford Laser TX3 4WD	10
=10	Leo Eriks	Subaru RX Turbo	10
=10	Chris Shearer	Mazda 323 4WD	10
=10	Ross Perry	Peugeot 205 GTi	10
=10	Jeff Grove	Mazda 323 4WD	10
