= 1982 Australian Rally Championship =

Rally event series

Seasons
- ← 1981 1983 →

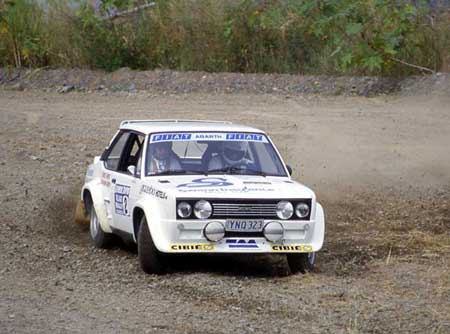
Greg Carr and Fred Gocentas in the Fiat 131 Abarth, Lutwyche Village Shopping Centre Rally, 1 May 1982.

The 1982 Australian Rally Championship was a series of five rallying events held across Australia. It was the 15th season in the history of the competition.

Geoff Portman and navigator Ross Runnalls in a Datsun 1600 won the 1982 Championship despite strong opposition from the Fiat 131 Abarth of Greg Carr and Fred Gocentas.

== Season review ==
The 15th Australian Rally Championship was held over five events across Australia, the season consisting of one event each for Queensland, Victoria and Western Australia and two for New South Wales. There was no major factory support for any of the teams and with a wide variety of cars and competitors it was a difficult season to predict an outcome. At the end of the year Portman and Runnalls had held off tough opposition from Carr and Gocentas and brought their 12-year-old Datsun 1600 home to its first ARC championship.

== The Rallies ==
The five events of the 1982 season were as follows.

Round	Rally	Date
1	Lutwyche Village Shopping Centre Rally (QLD)	1–2 May 1982
2	The Sunday Times Safari (WA)	5–6 June 1982
3	Dunlop 2GO Rally (NSW)	14–15 August 1982
4	Commonwealth Motors Rally (NSW)	4 September 1982
5	Arco Alpine Rally (VIC)	20–21 November 1982

=== Round One – The Lutwyche Village Shopping Centre Rally ===
Position	Driver	Navigator	Car	Penalties
1	Greg Carr	Fred Gocentas	Fiat 131 Abarth	
2	Ed Mulligan	Geoff Jones	Ford Escort BDA	
3	Wayne Bell	Colin Parry	Holden Commodore	
4	Peter Glennie	Brian Smith	Datsun Stanza	
5	Doug Thompson	Jim Maude	Datsun Stanza	
6	Dennis Brown	Warren Tegg	Ford Escort	
7	John Atkinson	Monty Suffern	Datsun Stanza	
8	Mark Taylor	Errol Bailey	Mitsubishi Lancer	
9	Peter Marcovich	Greg Weale	Ford Escort	

=== Round Two – The Sunday Times Safari ===
Position	Driver	Navigator	Car	Penalties
1	Geoff Portman	Ross Runnalls	Datsun 1600	157m 26s
2	Greg Carr	Fred Gocentas	Fiat 131 Abarth	159m 59 s
3	Clive Slater	Rod van der Stratten	Toyota Corolla	161m 26s
4	Tony Masling	Geoff Jones	Datsun Stanza	161m 43s
5	Bob Nicoli	David Hartley	Datsun Stanza	163m 20s
6	Doug Thompson	Jim Maude	Datsun Stanza	165m 35s
7	Wayne Bell	Colin Parry	Holden Commodore	
8	Jim Martin	Peter MacNeall	Datsun 1600	
9	Mark Anderson	David Burton	Datsun 1600	
10	John Atkinson	Monty Suffern	Datsun Stanza	

=== Round Three – The Dunlop 2GO Rally ===
Position	Driver	Navigator	Car	Penalties
1	Geoff Portman	Ross Runnalls	Datsun 1600	2m 44.55s
2	Greg Carr	Fred Gocentas	Fiat 131 Abarth	2m 45.23s
3	Hugh Bell	Steve Ellis	Datsun 1600	2m 46.15s
4	Tony Masling	Dave Boddy	Datsun Stanza V8	2m 49.29s
5	Gary Burns	Jim Gleeson	Ford Escort BDA	2m 50.40s
6	Colin Bond	John Dawson-Damer	Triumph TR8	2m 50.57s
7	Ross Dunkerton	Paul Rainer	Datsun 1600	2m 51.22s
8	David Officer	Kate Hobson	Mitsubishi Galant	2m 52.15s
9	Doug Thompson	Ron Lugg	Datsun Stanza	2m 53.13s
10	Clive Slater	Adrian Stafford	Toyota Corolla	2m 55.44s

=== Round Four – The Commonwealth Motors Rally ===
Position	Driver	Navigator	Car	Penalties
1	Geoff Portman	Ross Runnalls	Datsun 1600	105m 43s
2	Greg Carr	Fred Gocentas	Fiat 131 Abarth	109m 30s
3	Doug Thompson	Ron Lugg	Datsun Stanza	113m 55s
4	Barry Lowe	Ted Dobrzynski	Datsun 1600 "Dazda"	115m 24s
5	John Atkinson	Monty Suffern	Datsun Stanza	118m 47s
6	Don Ogilvie	Stephen Simmons	Datsun	120m 53s
7	John Macara	David Hartley	Mazda	121m 20s
8	Phil Horan	Adrian Ward	Datsun	123m 40s
9	Peter Pittaway	Chris Travers	Falcon XW ute	124m 36s
10	Kevin Pedder	Peter Gubbins	Datsun	125m 03s

=== Round Five – Arco Alpine Rally ===
Position	Driver	Navigator	Car	Penalties
1	Geoff Portman	Ross Runnalls	Datsun 1600	340m 56s
2	Doug Thompson	Ron Lugg	Datsun Stanza	354m 39s
3	Steve Ashton	Rosemary Nixon	Datsun 1600	355m 18s
4	Greg Carr	Fred Gocentas	Fiat 131 Abarth	359m 53s
5	Ian Swan	Derek Rawson	Datsun Stanza	360m 39s
6	Brian Smith	Peter Mignot	Mitsubishi Galant	361m 37s
7	Peter Clarke	Michael Harker	Datsun Stanza	362m 41s
8	Paul Bramble	Kel Haynes	Mitsubishi Lancer	364m 34s
9	Chris Berry	Ray Stubbs	Datsun	364m 44s
10	Jon Waterhouse	Gregory Avon	Mazda	366m 04s

== 1982 Drivers and Navigators Championships ==
Final pointscore for 1982 is as follows.

=== Geoff Portman – Champion Driver 1982 ===
Position	Driver	Car	Points
1	Geoff Portman	Datsun 1600	96
2	Greg Carr	Fiat 131 Abarth	89
3	Doug Thompson	Datsun Stanza	43
4	Tony Masling	Datsun Stanza	22
5	Ed Mulligan	Ford Escort RS 1800	18
=5	Wayne Bell	Holden Commodore	18

=== Ross Runnalls – Champion Navigator 1982 ===
Position	Navigator	Car	Points
1	Ross Runnalls	Datsun 1600	
2	Fred Gocentas	Fiat 131 Abarth	
3	Geoff Jones	Datsun Stanza	
4	Col Parry	Holden Commodore	
5	Rod van der Stratten	Toyota Corolla	
6	Steve Ellis	Datsun 1600	
