= Australian Rally Championship =

National gravel rally championship in Australia

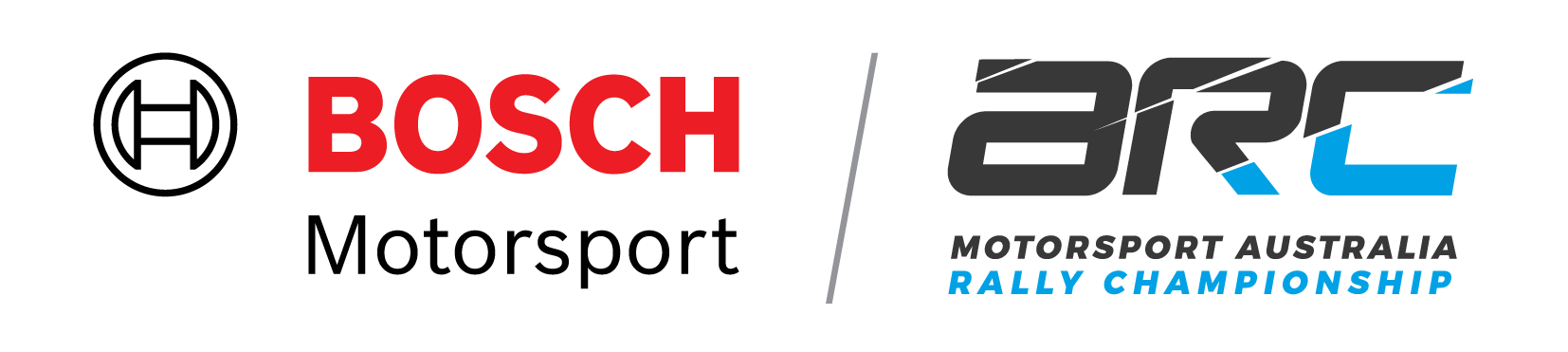
- Category: Rallying
- Country: Australia
- Inaugural season: 1968
- Tyre suppliers: MRF Tyres
- Drivers' champion: Harry Bates; Coral Taylor
- Teams' champion: Toyota Gazoo Racing Australia
- Official website: rally.com.au

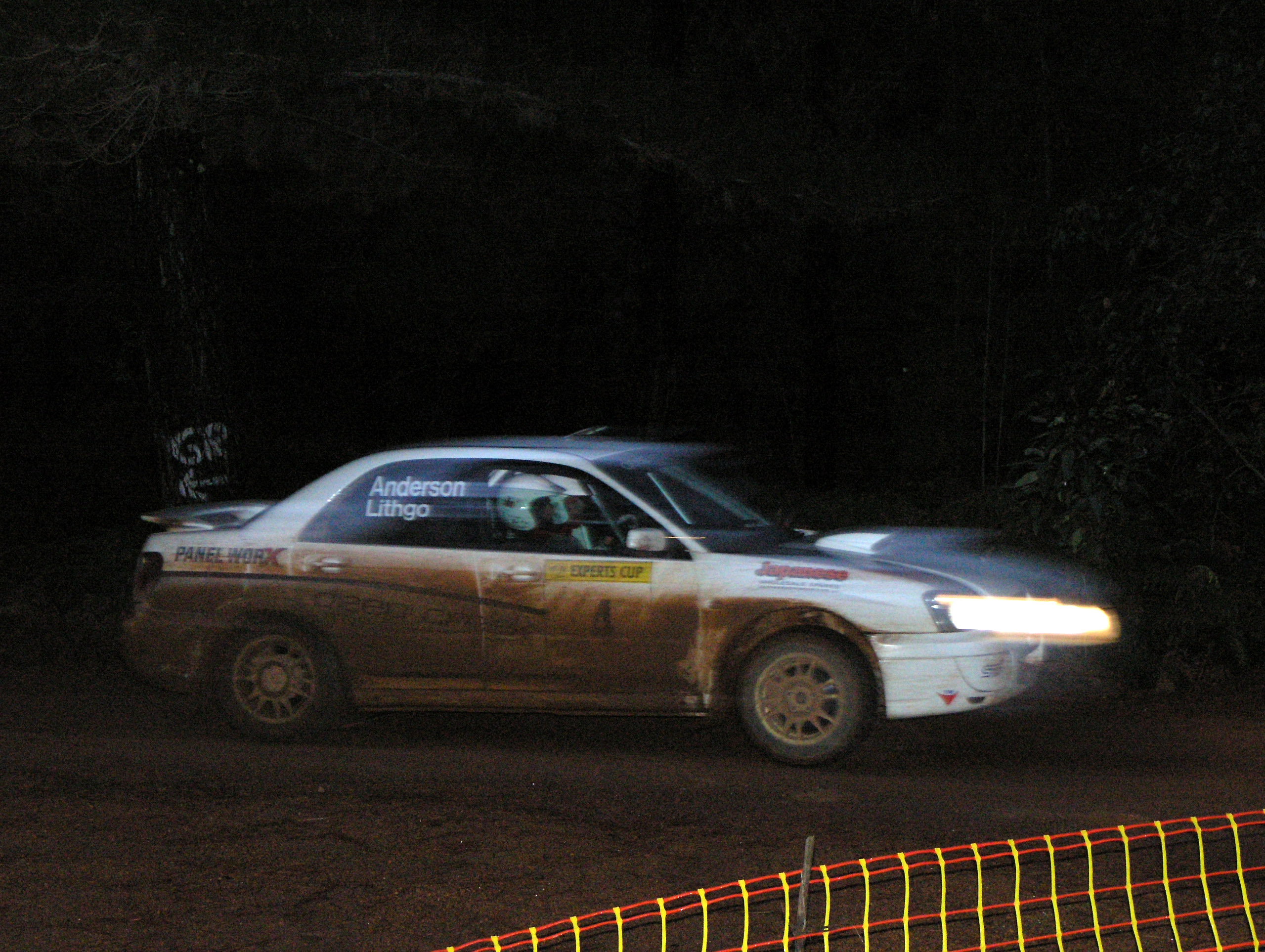
Australian Rally Championship, West Australian Round, night stage. 2006.

The Australian Rally Championship, also commonly known as the ARC, is Australia's premier gravel rally competition. A multi-event national championship has been held each year since 1968, excepting 2020.

== Competition ==
The Australian Rally Championship (ARC) is typically contested over six rounds held across various regions of Australia.

=== Championship titles and ARC Cups ===
In addition to the outright Drivers’ and Co-Drivers’ titles, the ARC features several sub-championships—known collectively as ARC Cups—which include the Production Cup, 2WD Cup, Junior Cup, and Classic Cup.

=== Event formats ===
The championship includes a mixture of endurance and sprint formats:

- Endurance events span multiple days, with championship points awarded based on the overall rally results.
- Sprint events are structured into separate heats, typically held across two days, with points allocated at the conclusion of each heat.

=== Scoring and points allocation ===
According to the official ARC Sporting & Technical Regulations:

- Sprint events allocate points per heat in descending order from 50 for first place to 1 for twentieth, applicable across outright and cup classifications.
- Endurance events award points at the rally conclusion, with 100 points for first place, down to 2 points for twentieth.
- To resolve ties in the Outright Championship, higher overall event placings are considered; for ARC Cups, the higher outright placing is used as the tie-breaker.

=== Power Stage ===
Each rally incorporates a Power Stage—a final special stage offering bonus points to the fastest crews. The current system awards 10 points to the fastest crew, 6 to second, then 4, 2, and 1 point respectively down to fifth place. For example, at the 2024 season finale in Tasmania, the Power Stage offered 10 bonus points on top of the 100 points awarded for the endurance event winner.

== Events ==
Six rounds comprised the 2024 Bosch Motorsport Australia Rally Championship

• Rally of Canberra: 5–7 April

• Forest Rally: 17–19 May

• Rally Queensland: 28–30 June

• Gippsland Rally: 9–11 August

• Adelaide Hills Rally: 13–15 September

• Rally Launceston: 22–24 November

== Competition classes ==
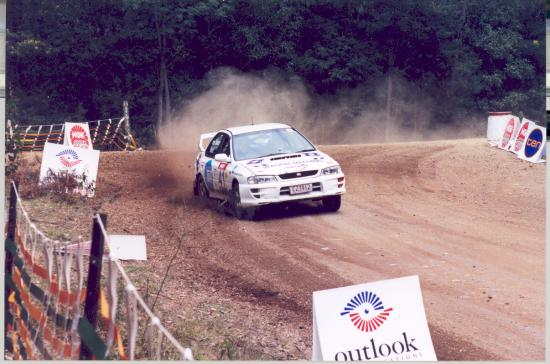
A Subaru Impreza WRX competing in an Australian rally.

The Australia Rally Championship caters to a range of different competitors in the series and with a number of classes and categories; competitors can start rallying at the level that best suits their budget. The outright competition is fought out amongst the names of rallying and is the ultimate test for the competitors at the pointy end of the field. The ARC's top drivers compete in Group N (Production) - cars which have direct links to their road-going counterparts. The ARC also offers opportunities for manufacturers who don't produce Group N cars to build comparable machinery under both the Group N (P) and FIA Super 2000 regulations. Another award that is desirable for competitors to chase is the Privateers Cup for competitors who don't have support from the manufacturer teams. The F16 Championship is the small car category (1600cc, 2WD) and a budget-level place to start rallying. The outright winner of the Championship is an Australian Champion in the small car category and is added to the record books. The Aussie Cup is the Australian award for large cars (over 2500cc) that enables competitors in the big cars to run popular passenger car models such as V6 and V8's. Amongst the outright awards are the opportunities to chase individual class awards that are based on car capacity and specification which gives competitors the opportunity to pursue class victories.

== Cars ==
The more successful cars in recent years of the ARC have been the 4WD 2.0L Turbo models such as the Mitsubishi Lancer Evolutions, Subaru Impreza WRX STIs and the Toyota Corolla ARC-spec cars, which are actually running Toyota Celica GT-Four engines, 4WD system, etc.. Michael Guest and Mark Stacey campaigned a RWD 2.5L normally aspirated Ford Focus during the 2006 season, switching to a Ford Fiesta prepared for the Super 2000 class in 2007. Most of the cars in the privateer fields are of a similar make, but other makes with success have been the Mitsubishi Mirage, Mitsubishi Galant VR-4, Subaru Legacy, Datsun 1600, Datsun 240Z, Nissan Stanza and the Suzuki Swift GTi.

== Drivers ==
As with the cars, it tends to be the factory-entered drivers that take the outright placings. Some of these drivers have been Colin Bond, Greg Carr. George Fury, Ross Dunkerton, Geoff Portman, Scott Pedder, Simon Evans, Neal Bates, the late Possum Bourne and Ed Ordynski. Privateer crews that have enjoyed recent success include Nathan Quinn and Steve Glenney. In 2015 Molly Taylor became the first woman to win a heat in the Australian Rally Championship.

== Winners ==
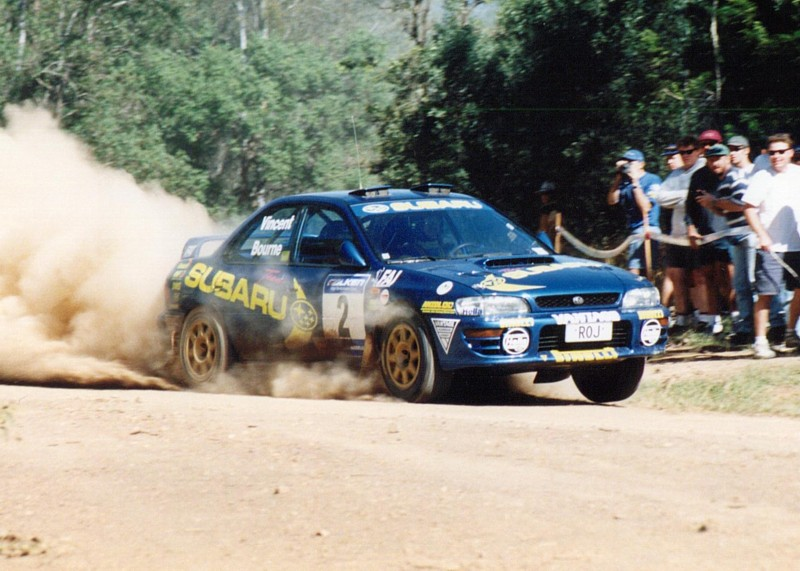
Possum Bourne and Craig Vincent (1998)

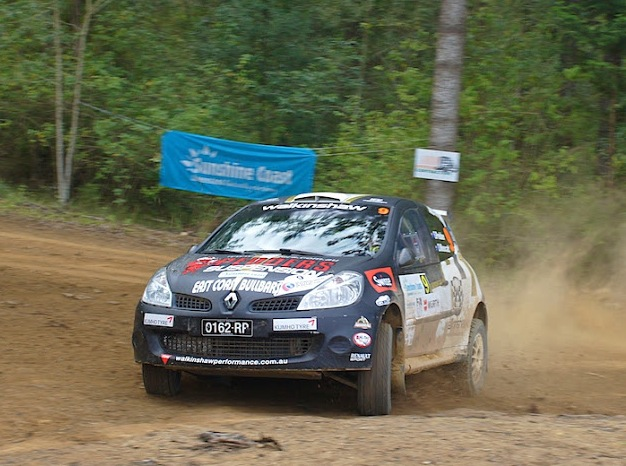
Scott Pedder and Dale Moscatt. Renault Clio R3. International Rally of Queensland 2014

=== Australian Rally Champions ===
| Year | Driver | Co-driver | Vehicle |
|---|---|---|---|
| 1968 | (Victoria (state)) Harry Firth | (Victoria (state)) Graham Hoinville | Ford Cortina Lotus |
| 1969 | (Victoria (state)) Frank Kilfoyle | (New South Wales) Doug Rutherford | Ford Cortina Lotus |
| 1970 | (Victoria (state)) Robert Watson | (Victoria (state)) Jim McAuliffe | Renault R8 Gordini |
| 1971 | (New South Wales) Colin Bond | (New South Wales) George Shepheard | Holden Torana LC GTR XU-1 |
| 1972 | (New South Wales) Colin Bond | (New South Wales) George Shepheard | Holden Torana LJ GTR XU-1 |
| 1973 | (Australian Capital Territory) Peter Lang | (Victoria (state)) Warwick Smith | Holden Torana LJ GTR XU-1 |
| 1974 | (New South Wales) Colin Bond | (New South Wales) George Shepheard | Holden Torana LJ GTR XU-1 |
| 1975 | (Western Australia) Ross Dunkerton | (Western Australia) John Large | Datsun 240Z |
| 1976 | (Western Australia) Ross Dunkerton | (Victoria (state)) Jeff Beaumont | Datsun 260Z |
| 1977 | (Western Australia) Ross Dunkerton (Victoria (state)) George Fury | (Victoria (state)) Jeff Beaumont (Victoria (state)) Monty Suffern | Datsun 260Z; Datsun 710 |
| 1978 | (Australian Capital Territory) Greg Carr | (New South Wales) John Dawson-Damer* | Ford Escort RS |
| 1979 | (Western Australia) Ross Dunkerton | (Tasmania) Jeff Beaumont | Datsun Stanza |
| 1980 | (Victoria (state)) George Fury | (Victoria (state)) Monty Suffern | Datsun Stanza |
| 1981 | (Victoria (state)) Geoff Portman | (Victoria (state)) Ross Runnalls | Datsun Stanza |
| 1982 | (Victoria (state)) Geoff Portman | (Victoria (state)) Ross Runnalls | Datsun 1600 |
| 1983 | (Western Australia) Ross Dunkerton | (New South Wales) Geoff Jones | Datsun 1600 |
| 1984 | (Victoria (state)) David Officer | (Victoria (state)) Kate Officer | Mitsubishi Galant GB |
| 1985 | (South Australia) Barry Lowe | (South Australia) Kevin Pedder | Subaru RX Turbo |
| 1986 | (South Australia) Barry Lowe | (Victoria (state)) Kate Officer ** | Subaru RX Turbo |
| 1987 | (Australian Capital Territory) Greg Carr | (Australian Capital Territory) Fred Gocentas | Alfa Romeo GTV6 |
| 1988 | (Queensland) Murray Coote | (Queensland) Iain Stewart | Mazda 323 4WD |
| 1989 | (Australian Capital Territory) Greg Carr | (Australian Capital Territory) Mick Harker | Lancia Delta Integrale |
| 1990 | (South Australia) Ed Ordynski | (South Australia) Mark Nelson | Mitsubishi Galant VR-4 |
| 1991 | (Western Australia) Robert Herridge | (Western Australia) Steve Vanderbyl | Subaru Liberty RS |
| 1992 | (Western Australia) Robert Herridge | (South Australia) Mark Nelson | Subaru Liberty RS |
| 1993 | (Australian Capital Territory) Neal Bates | (New South Wales) Coral Taylor | Toyota Celica GT-Four |
| 1994 | (Australian Capital Territory) Neal Bates | (New South Wales) Coral Taylor | Toyota Celica GT-Four |
| 1995 | (Australian Capital Territory) Neal Bates | (New South Wales) Coral Taylor | Toyota Celica GT-Four |
| 1996 | (New Zealand) Possum Bourne | (New South Wales) Craig Vincent | Subaru Impreza 555 |
| 1997 | (New Zealand) Possum Bourne | (New South Wales) Craig Vincent | Subaru Impreza 555 |
| 1998 | (New Zealand) Possum Bourne | (New South Wales) Craig Vincent | Subaru Impreza 555 |
| 1999 | (New Zealand) Possum Bourne | (New South Wales) Craig Vincent | Subaru Impreza WRC98 |
| 2000 | (New Zealand) Possum Bourne | (Queensland) Mark Stacey | Subaru Impreza WRC98 |
| 2001 | (New Zealand) Possum Bourne | (New South Wales) Craig Vincent | Subaru Impreza WRC |
| 2002 | (New Zealand) Possum Bourne | (Queensland) Mark Stacey | Subaru Impreza WRX STi |
| 2003 | (Victoria (state)) Cody Crocker | (Victoria (state)) Greg Foletta | Subaru Impreza WRX STi |
| 2004 | (Victoria (state)) Cody Crocker | (Victoria (state)) Greg Foletta | Subaru Impreza WRX STi |
| 2005 | (Victoria (state)) Cody Crocker | (Victoria (state)) Dale Moscatt | Subaru Impreza WRX STi Spec-C |
| 2006 | (Victoria (state)) Simon Evans | (Victoria (state)) Sue Evans | Toyota Corolla Sportivo (NP) |
| 2007 | (Victoria (state)) Simon Evans | (Victoria (state)) Sue Evans | Toyota Corolla Sportivo (NP) |
| 2008 | (Australian Capital Territory) Neal Bates | (New South Wales) Coral Taylor | Toyota Corolla S2000 |
| 2009 | (Victoria (state)) Simon Evans | (New South Wales) Sue Evans | Toyota Corolla S2000; Mitsubishi Lancer Evo IX |
| 2010 | (Victoria (state)) Simon Evans | (New South Wales) Sue Evans | Subaru Impreza WRX STi |
| 2011 | (Victoria (state)) Justin Dowel | (Victoria (state)) Matt Lee | Mitsubishi Lancer Evo IX |
| 2012 | 2WD: (Victoria (state)) Eli Evans | (Queensland) Glen Weston | Honda Jazz |
| 2012 | 4WD: (New South Wales) Michael Boaden | (New South Wales) Helen Cheers | Mitsubishi Lancer Evo IX |
| 2013 | (Victoria (state)) Eli Evans | (Queensland) Glen Weston | Honda Jazz |
| 2014 | (Victoria (state)) Scott Pedder | (New South Wales) Dale Moscatt | Renault Clio |
| 2015 | (Victoria (state)) Eli Evans | (Queensland) Glen Weston | Citroen DS3 |
| 2016 | (New South Wales) Molly Taylor | (Western Australia) Bill Hayes | Subaru Impreza WRX STi |
| 2017 | (New South Wales) Nathan Quinn | (Western Australia) Bill Hayes *** | Mitsubishi Lancer Evo IX |
| 2018 | (Victoria (state)) Eli Evans | (Western Australia) Ben Searcy | Skoda Fabia R5 |
| 2019 | (Australian Capital Territory) Harry Bates | (Queensland) John McCarthy | Toyota Yaris AP4 |
| 2020 | Not Awarded (COVID-19) | | |
| 2021 | Not Awarded (COVID-19) | | |
| 2022 | (Australian Capital Territory) Lewis Bates | (Queensland) Anthony McLoughlin | Toyota GR Yaris AP4 |
| 2023 | (Australian Capital Territory) Harry Bates | (New South Wales) Coral Taylor | Toyota GR Yaris AP4 |
| 2024 | (Australian Capital Territory) Harry Bates | (New South Wales) Coral Taylor | Toyota GR Yaris Rally2 |
| 2025 | (New Zealand) Hayden Paddon | (New Zealand) John Kennard | Hyundai i20 N Rally2 |

* Fred Gocentas co-drove for Greg Carr during the 1978 season while Dawson-Damer co-drove for Colin Bond while also scoring points on one occasion co-driving for Dave Morrow which enabled him to beat Gocentas to the co-driver's title.
** Kate Officer co-drove for David Officer during the 1986 season.
*** Bill Hayes co-drove for Molly Taylor during the 2017 season. David Calder and Ben Searcy co-drove for Quinn in 2017.

=== Group N Rally Championship ===
| Year | Driver | Co-driver | Vehicle |
|---|---|---|---|
| 1990 | Ed Ordynski (SA) | Mark Nelson (SA) | Mitsubishi Galant VR4 |
| 1991 | Bob Nicoli (WA) | Brian Harwood (WA) | Daihatsu Charade GTti |
| 1992 | Robert Herridge (WA) | Mark Nelson (SA) | Subaru Liberty RS |
| 1993 | Ed Ordynski (SA) | Mark Stacey (SA) | Mitsubishi Lancer RS-E |
| 1994 | Ed Ordynski (SA) | Mark Stacey (SA) | Mitsubishi Lancer RS-E2 |
| 1995 | Ed Ordynski (SA) | Mark Stacey (SA) | Mitsubishi Lancer RS-Ev2 |
| 1996 | Michael Guest (NSW) | Steve O'Brien-Pounde (NSW) | Mitsubishi Lancer Evo 3 |
| 1997 | Michael Guest (NSW) | Mark Stacey (SA) | Mitsubishi Lancer Evo 3 |
| 1998 | Cody Crocker (VIC) | Greg Foletta (VIC) | Subaru Impreza WRX |
| 1999 | Cody Crocker (VIC) | Greg Foletta (VIC) | Subaru Impreza WRX |
| 2000 | Cody Crocker (VIC) | Greg Foletta (VIC) | Subaru Impreza WRX |
| 2001 | Cody Crocker (VIC) | Greg Foletta (VIC) | Subaru Impreza WRX |
| 2002 | Possum Bourne (NZ) | Mark Stacey (QLD) | Subaru Impreza WRX |

=== Australian Manufacturers Champions ===
| Year | Company |
|---|---|
| 1969 | Ford Motor Co of Aust. |
| 1970 | Renault (Aust) Pty Ltd |
| 1971 | General Motors-Holden's |
| 1972 | General Motors-Holden's |
| 1973 | General Motors-Holden's |
| 1974 | General Motors-Holden's |
| 1975 | Nissan Motor Co (Aust) |
| 1976 | Nissan Motor Co (Aust) |
| 1977 | Nissan Motor Co (Aust) |
| 1988 | Mazda Motors Pty Ltd |
| 1989 | Lancia Spa |
| 1990 | Mitsubishi Motors Aust Ltd |
| 1991 | Daihatsu Australia Pty Ltd |
| 1992 | Daihatsu Australia Pty Ltd |
| 1993 | Daihatsu Australia Pty Ltd |
| 1994 | Daihatsu Australia Pty Ltd |
| 1995 | Daihatsu Australia Pty Ltd |
| 1996 | Daihatsu Australia Pty Ltd |
| 1997 | Mitsubishi Motors Aust Ltd |
| 1998 | Subaru Australia Pty Ltd |
| 1999 | Subaru Australia Pty Ltd |
| 2000 | Subaru Australia Pty Ltd |
| 2001 | Subaru Australia Pty Ltd |
| 2002 | Subaru Australia Pty Ltd |
| 2003 | Subaru Australia Pty Ltd |
| 2004 | Subaru Australia Pty Ltd |
| 2005 | Subaru Australia Pty Ltd |
| 2006 | Toyota Motor Corporation Australia Limited |
| 2007 | Toyota Motor Corporation Australia Limited |
| 2012 | Honda Motor Company Australia Limited |
| 2013 | Honda Motor Company Australia Limited |
| 2014 | Citroen Australia |
| 2015 | Citroen Australia |
| 2016 | Subaru Australia Pty Ltd |
| 2022 | Toyota Motor Corporation Australia Limited |
| 2023 | Toyota Motor Corporation Australia Limited |
| 2024 | Toyota Motor Corporation Australia Limited |
| 2025 | Toyota Motor Corporation Australia Limited |

=== Australian Formula 2 Rally Champions ===
| Year | Driver | Co-driver | Vehicle |
|---|---|---|---|
| 1995 | Bob Nicoli (WA) | Claire Parker (WA) | Daihatsu Charade GTi |
| 1996 | Ross Mackenzie (WA) | Tony Brandon (ACT) | Daihatsu Charade GTi |
| 1997 | Brett Middleton (NSW) | Linda Long (NSW) | Honda Civic |
| 1998 | Rick Bates (ACT) | Jenny Brittan (NSW) | Daihatsu Charade GTi |
| 1999 | Simon Evans (VIC) | Sue Evans (VIC) | VW Golf Mk III Kit Car |
| 2000 | Lee Peterson (TAS) | Graham Legg-Stoker (VIC) | Nissan Pulsar GTi |
| 2001 | Andrew Hannigan (WA) | Duncan Jordan (WA) | Daihatsu Charade GTi |
| 2002 | Warwick Rooklyn (NSW) | Linda Long (NSW) | Daihatsu Charade GTi |

=== Australian F16 Rally Champions ===
| Year | Driver | Co-driver | Vehicle |
|---|---|---|---|
| 2003 | Lee Peterson (TAS) | Graham Legg-Stoker (VIC) | Mitsubishi Mirage Cyborg |
| 2004 | Denise Collins (SA) | Gerard McConkey (QLD) | Honda Civic |
| 2005 | Leigh Garrioch (VIC) | Ken Garrioch (VIC) | Mitsubishi Mirage Cyborg |
| 2006 | Leigh Garrioch (VIC) | Ken Garrioch (VIC) | Mitsubishi Mirage Cyborg |

== See also ==
- Motorsport in Australia
- List of Australian motor racing series
