= 1988 Australian Rally Championship =

Seasons
- ← 1987 1989 →

The 1988 Australian Rally Championship was a series of rallying events held across Australia. It was the 21st season of the Australian Rally Championship.

The series for 1988 had just four events, with Queenslanders Murray Coote and Iain Stewart taking out the title in their Mazda 323 4WD. Four-wheel drive vehicles dominated the series signalling the end of any chances of two wheel drive vehicles being competitive. The Alpine Rally was not included in the year's events, and the Esanda Rally in the ACT was only included at the last minute after the cancellation of the Queensland rally round due to withdrawal of Police permission to use Shire Roads.

== Season review ==
The 21st Australian Rally Championship was held over four events across Australia, the season consisting of one event each for Tasmania, Western Australia, New South Wales and Australian Capital Territory.

== The Rallies ==
The four events of the 1988 season were as follows.

Round	Rally	Date
1	APPM/TT-Line Rally Tasmania	26–27 March 1988
2	BP Visco Forest Rally (WA)	30 April – 1 May 1988
3	2EC Bega Valley Rally (NSW)	11–12 June 1988
4	Esanda Finance Rally of Australia (ACT)	12–14 August 1988

=== Round One – APPM/TT-Line Rally Tasmania ===
Position	Driver	Navigator	Car	Time
1	Murray Coote	Iain Stewart	Mazda 323 4WD	4h 17m 06s
2	Greg Carr	Fred Gocentas	Mitsubishi Starion	4h 20m 42s
3	Peter Glennie	Peter Clark	Subaru RX Turbo	4h 24m 33s
4	David Officer	Kate Officer	Mitsubishi Starion	4h 25m 57s
5	Patrick Barber	Simon Brown	Ford Laser TX3 4WD	4h 25m 36s
6	Graham Alexander	David Stewart	Toyota Corolla GT	4h 30m 30s
7	George Kahler	Tony Best	Mazda 323 4WD	4h 31m 35s
8	Adrian Taylor	Dave Ambrose	Honda Civic CRX	4h 32m 02s

=== Round Two – BP Visco Forest Rally ===
Position	Driver	Navigator	Car	Time
1	Wayne Bell	Dave Boddy	Mazda 323 4WD	3h 17m 59s
2	Greg Carr	Fred Gocentas	Mitsubishi Starion	3h 20m 08s
3	Murray Coote	Iain Stewart	Mazda 323 4WD	3h 22m 09s
4	Rob Herridge	Steve Vanderbyl	Subaru RX Turbo	3h 22m 37s
5	John Macara	Rod van der Straaten	Subaru RX Turbo	3h 22m 46s
6	Patrick Barber	Simon Brown	Ford Laser TX3 4WD	3h 30m 49s
7	Mark Tolcher	David Tolcher	Subaru RX Turbo	3h 32m 15s
8	Tony Flood	Martin Morris	Toyota Corolla GT	3h 32m 34s

=== Round Three – 2EC Bega Valley Rally ===
Position	Driver	Navigator	Car	Time
1	David Eadie	Chris Shearer	Mazda 323 4WD	2h 55m 42s
2	Mark Roach	Mark Price	Mazda 323 4WD	2h 58m 27s
3	Greg Carr	Fred Gocentas	Mitsubishi Starion	2h 58m 33s
4	Murray Coote	Iain Stewart	Mazda 323 4WD	2h 59m 00s
5	Eric Pietila	Mike Rebbechi	Mazda 323 4WD	3h 01m 14s
6	Mark Tolcher	David Tolcher	Subaru RX Turbo	3h 03m 58s
7	Ian Hill	Phil Bonser	Subaru RX Turbo	3h 04m 50s
8	Patrick Barber	Simon Brown	Ford Laser TX3 4WD	3h 06m 47s
9	George Kahler	Tony Best	Mazda 323 4WD	3h 09m 18s
10	Graham Alexander	David Stewart	Toyota Corolla GT	3h 09m 30s

=== Round Four – Esanda Finance Rally of Australia ===
Position	Driver	Navigator	Car	Time
1	Murray Coote	Iain Stewart	Mazda 323 4WD	3h 26m 54s
2	David Eadie	Chris Shearer	Mazda 323 4WD	3h 28m 17s
3	Peter Clark	David Boddy	Mazda 323 4WD	3h 28m 23s
4	Greg Carr	Fred Gocentas	Mitsubishi Starion	3h 29m 14s
5	Ed Ordynski	Mark Nelson	Subaru RX Turbo	3h 31m 11s
6	David Officer	Kate Officer	Mitsubishi Starion	3h 34m 58s
7	George Kahler	Tony Best	Mazda 323 4WD	3h 37m 11s
8	Adrian Taylor	Dave Ambrose	Honda Civic CRX	3h 38m 02s
9	Jon Waterhouse	Russ Witty	Mazda RX-7	3h 40m 56s
10	Jim Middleton	Dale Payne	Holden Commodore V8	3h 41m 12s

== 1988 Drivers and Navigators Championships ==
Final pointscore for 1988 is as follows.

=== Murray Coote – Champion Driver 1988 ===
Position	Driver	Car	Points
1	Murray Coote	Mazda 323 4WD	62
2	Greg Carr	Mitsubishi Starion	52
3	David Eadie	Mazda 323 4WD	35
4	Wayne Bell	Mazda 323 4WD	20
5	Patrick Barber	Ford Laser TX3 4WD	18
6	Mark Roach	Mazda 323 4WD	15

=== Iain Stewart – Champion Navigator 1988 ===
Position	Navigator	Car	Points
1	Iain Stewart	Mazda 323 4WD	62
2	Fred Gocentas	Mitsubishi Starion	52
3	Chris Shearer	Mazda 323 4WD	35
4	Dave Boddy	Mazda 323 4WD	20
5	Simon Brown	Ford Laser TX3 4WD	18
6	Mark Price	Mazda 323 4WD	15
