= Greg Carr (rally driver) =

Australian rally driver

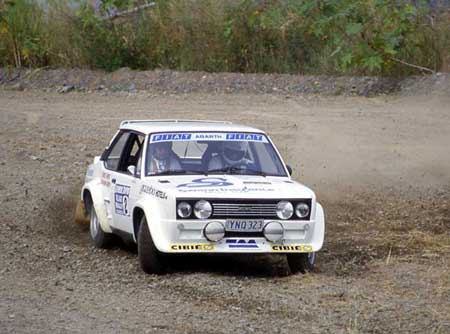

Greg Carr is an Australian former rally driver. Carr won the Australian Rally Championship three times and dominated the prestigious Castrol International Rally in the 1970s as well as winning numerous other rallies.

Carr rose through the ranks of Australian rallying driving a Datsun 1600 starting in the 1973 rallying season. In 1975 Carr and navigator Wayne Gregson won the Bunbury Curran Rally. Carr began his domination of his local Canberra rally, the Don Capasco Rally (later called the Castrol International Rally) in 1975. He won the prestigious event six times in succession.

In 1976 Carr won four rallies in a Gerry Ball-sponsored Datsun 180B SSS. Then in 1977 Carr's burgeoning talent was rewarded by Colin Bond, the manager of a new two-car Ford works rally team, when Bond signed up Carr to drive a works Ford Escort RS2000. Carr had his first Australian Rally Championship round win with the Ford works team in the 1977 Bega Valley Rally. In the Southern Cross Rally that year Carr led until late on the last night when put out by alternator failure.

In 1978 Carr won the Australian Rally Championship for the Ford works team. During this era Carr and Bond in their Escorts clashed with Ross Dunkerton and George Fury in their works Datsuns in what is widely regarded as a classic period of Australian rallying. Carr won numerous rallies during his four years at the Ford rally team, including four victories in the Castrol International Rally which was held in the forests around Canberra.

In 1980 Carr again went close to winning the prestigious Southern Cross Rally finishing second to Ross Dunkerton and ahead of teammate Finnish world rally champion Ari Vatanen. The Ford works rally team was wound up at the end of the 1980 season.

In 1987 Greg Carr won his second national rally championship, with navigator Fred Gocentas, in an Alfa Romeo GTV6. Two years later Carr added a third Australian Rally Championship title to his name driving a Lancia Delta Integrale with Mick Harker as his navigator.

== Career results ==
Season	Series	Position	Car	Team
1977	Australian Rally Championship	5th	Ford Escort RS2000	Ford Australia
1978	Australian Rally Championship	1st	Ford Escort RS1800	Ford Australia
1979	Australian Rally Championship	2nd	Ford Escort RS1800	Ford Australia
1980	Australian Rally Championship	5th	Ford Escort RS1800	Ford Australia
1982	Australian Rally Championship	2nd	Fiat Abarth	
1984	Australian Rally Championship	3rd	Fiat Abarth	
1986	Australian Rally Championship	5th	Alfa Romeo GTV6	
1987	Australian Rally Championship	1st	Alfa Romeo GTV6	
1988	Australian Rally Championship	2nd	Alfa Romeo GTV6	
1989	Australian Rally Championship	1st	Lancia Delta Integrale	

Preceded by Ross Dunkerton and George Fury	Winner of the Australian Rally Championship; 1978	Succeeded by Ross Dunkerton
Preceded by Barry Lowe	Winner of the Australian Rally Championship; 1987	Succeeded by Murray Coote
Preceded by Murray Coote	Winner of the Australian Rally Championship; 1989	Succeeded by Ed Ordynski
