= Bega Valley Rally =

Car rally centred in New South Wales, Australia

The Bega Valley Rally is one of the main car rallies held in Australia and has a history dating from the 1960s when it evolved from the Snowy Mountains Rally. It has been centred in the New South Wales town of Bega since 1973 and uses roads and forestry tracks in the Southern NSW/Victorian Border Region.

== List of winners ==
| Year | Name of Rally | Driver | Vehicle |
|---|---|---|---|
| 1968 | Rothmans Snowy Rally | Barry Ferguson | Volkswagen |
| 1969 | Rothmans Snowy Rally | Evan Green | Austin 1800 |
| 1970 | Cibie Snowy Rally | Bob Watson | Renault Gordini |
| 1971 | Snowy Mountains Rally | Colin Bond | Holden Torana GTR XU-1 |
| 1972 | Snowy Mountains Rally | Colin Bond | Holden Torana GTR XU-1 |
| 1973 | Bega Valley Rally | Peter Lang | Holden Torana GTR XU-1 |
| 1974 | Bega Valley Rally | Stewart McLeod | Datsun 260Z |
| 1975 | Bega Valley Rally | Colin Bond | Holden Torana SL/R5000 |
| 1976 | Ampol Bega Valley Rally | Ross Dunkerton | Datsun 240Z |
| 1977 | Ampol Bega Valley Rally | Greg Carr | Ford Escort RS2000 |
| 1978 | Ampol Bega Valley Rally | Greg Carr | Ford Escort |
| 1979 | Ampol Bega Valley Rally | Colin Bond | Ford Escort RS2000 |
| 1980 | Ampol Bega Valley Rally | George Fury | Datsun Stanza |
| 1981 | Bega Valley Rally | Geoff Portman | Datsun Stanza |
| 1985 | Bega Valley Rally | Hugh Bell | Mazda RX-7 |
| 1986 | Bega Valley Rally | David Eadie | Datsun 1600 |
| 1987 | Bega Valley Rally | David Eadie | Mazda 323 4WD |
| 1988 | Bega Valley Rally | David Eadie | Mazda 323 4WD |
| 1990 | Bega Valley Rally | Michael Thompson | Subaru RX Turbo |
