= Datsun 510 =

Motor vehicle made by Nissan

Datsun Bluebird
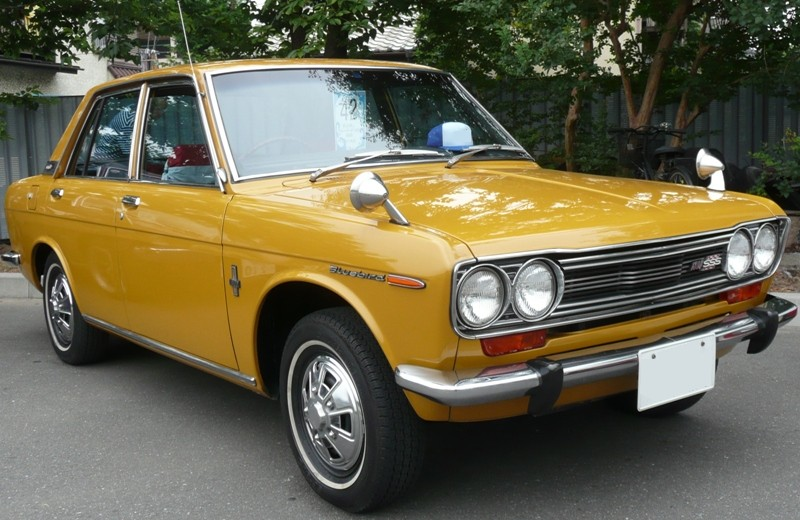
- Datsun Bluebird SSS 4-door (510)

Overview
- Manufacturer: Nissan
- Model code: 510
- Also called: Datsun 1300, 1400, 1500, 1600, 1800; Datsun Bluebird; Yue Loong Bluebird 706 (sedan)
- Production: August 1967–1973
- Assembly: Japan: Yokosuka, Kanagawa (Oppama plant); Australia: Melbourne, Victoria; New Zealand: Thames; Taiwan; Mexico: Civac, Cuernavaca
- Designer: Teruo Uchino

Body and chassis
- Body style: 2/4-door sedan 2-door coupé 5-door station wagon
- Layout: FR layout

Powertrain
- Engine: 1.3 L J13 OHV I4; 1.3 L L13 I4; 1.4 L L14 I4; 1.5 L J15 OHV I4; 1.6 L L16 I4; 1.8 L L18 I4

Dimensions
- Wheelbase: 95.3 in (2,420 mm)
- Length: 163.2 in (4,145 mm) (estate); 163 in (4,128 mm) (coupé)
- Width: 61.4 in (1,560 mm)
- Height: 56.5 in (1,435 mm) (estate); 56 in (1,410 mm) (coupé)
- Curb weight: 2,072.3 lb (940 kg) (estate); 2,127 lb (965 kg) (coupé)

Chronology
- Successor: Nissan Bluebird (610)

The Datsun 510 was the third generation of the Datsun Bluebird, sold from 1968 to 1973. "510" is Nissan's internal model code but was also used as the car's name in the United States. In Japan it was sold as the Datsun Bluebird, a name also used in some export markets. In most markets outside of Japan the car was sold as the Datsun 1300/1400/1500/1600/1800 (depending on engine variant), although the "Bluebird" would sometimes be referenced in advertising.

The rear-wheel drive 510 Bluebird's engineering was inspired by contemporary European sedans, particularly the 1966 BMW 1600-2 – incorporating an overhead camshaft engine and four-wheel independent suspension by means of MacPherson struts in front, and semi-trailing arms on the rear wheels. The styling is attributed to Datsun in-house designer, Teruo Uchino.

Nissan USA president Yutaka Katayama pushed for offering this generation of the Bluebird with a larger overhead cam engine with more power than the preceding models. The design originated with Prince Motor Company, which merged with Nissan in 1966. The Bluebird series had been Datsun's smaller offering, but the 1966 introduction of the 1-litre Sunny allowed Nissan to move the Bluebird up into the mid-size category.

The 510-series Bluebird was released in the domestic Japanese market on August 15, 1967. In the United States, the Datsun 510 was launched in October 1967 as a four-door sedan, followed by a two-door sedan (June 1968), five-door station wagon, and two-door coupé (November 1968). In Canada it was sold as the Datsun 1600.

The range became famous for Nissan's rallying successes outside Japan and paved the way for greater Nissan sales internationally. In Japan, it introduced a number of modern concepts which had hitherto not existed in mass-market cars: wide adoption of overhead cam engines, four-wheel independent suspension, and a clean, modern design which also eliminated the vent windows in the front doors.

The series was available with either a four-speed manual transmission or optional three-speed automatic. 510s, in some markets, offered twin Hitachi side-draft carburetors, which were a smaller version of the British SU design used on Jaguars and MGs. These engines also used enhanced compression and camshaft profiles to produce more power. SSS models (not offered in North America) offered upgraded instrumentation and interior trim, as well as appropriate exterior badges.

== Popularity ==
Affordable performance combined with simple mechanicals helped the Datsun 510 remain a popular automotive enthusiast's car for many years after its discontinuation. Avid collectors can be found around the world with significant numbers in the U.S., Australia, and New Zealand.

One advantage of the early Datsun cars is that many of the parts were interchangeable – engines, transmissions, and suspension setups, for example, were all similar enough to swap with minor modifications. This allowed the Datsun 510 to be easily upgraded from the 1.6l – L16 engine, to the 1.8l – L18 engine, and later to the 2.0L L20B engine, and to go from the four-speed manual transmission to the 63 mm (shaft-center distance) five-speed transmissions made available for the early (S10) 200SX and (A10) HL510, and the 71 mm five-speed transmissions used in the (S30 & S130) 280-series Z cars, 1980 to '83 (S110) 200SX, the 1977 to '80 (810) 810, the 1981 to '84 (910) 810/Maxima/Bluebird, and the C210/R30 series of Skylines. The 71 mm five-speed transmissions also saw extensive use in the 620/720/D21 series pick-up trucks in both long and short (rare) extension-housing versions.

Its positive reputation in North America also led to Nissan re-using the 510 model name there later on for the unrelated, 1978–1981 A10-series Nissan Violet in an effort to capture this range's glory - an effort reviewers considered a failure.

Hot Wheels manufactures several versions of the car.

== Variations and market differences ==
The P510 (RHD) and PL510 (LHD) were the most prevalent models in many export markets, including the U.S. The 1969 KP510T two-door coupe version arrived in small numbers to right-hand-drive markets, predominantly Japan's domestic market, unsaddled by engine emission regulations. The K prefix cars are coupés, with a swept roofline and shorter deck lid, while wagons carry a W prefix. For the 1974 model year, the 510 four-door sedan was dropped in favor of the 1974 PL610 series cars. The J series pushrod-engined models were also seen in many developing markets, where lower cost and ease of maintenance carried particular weight.

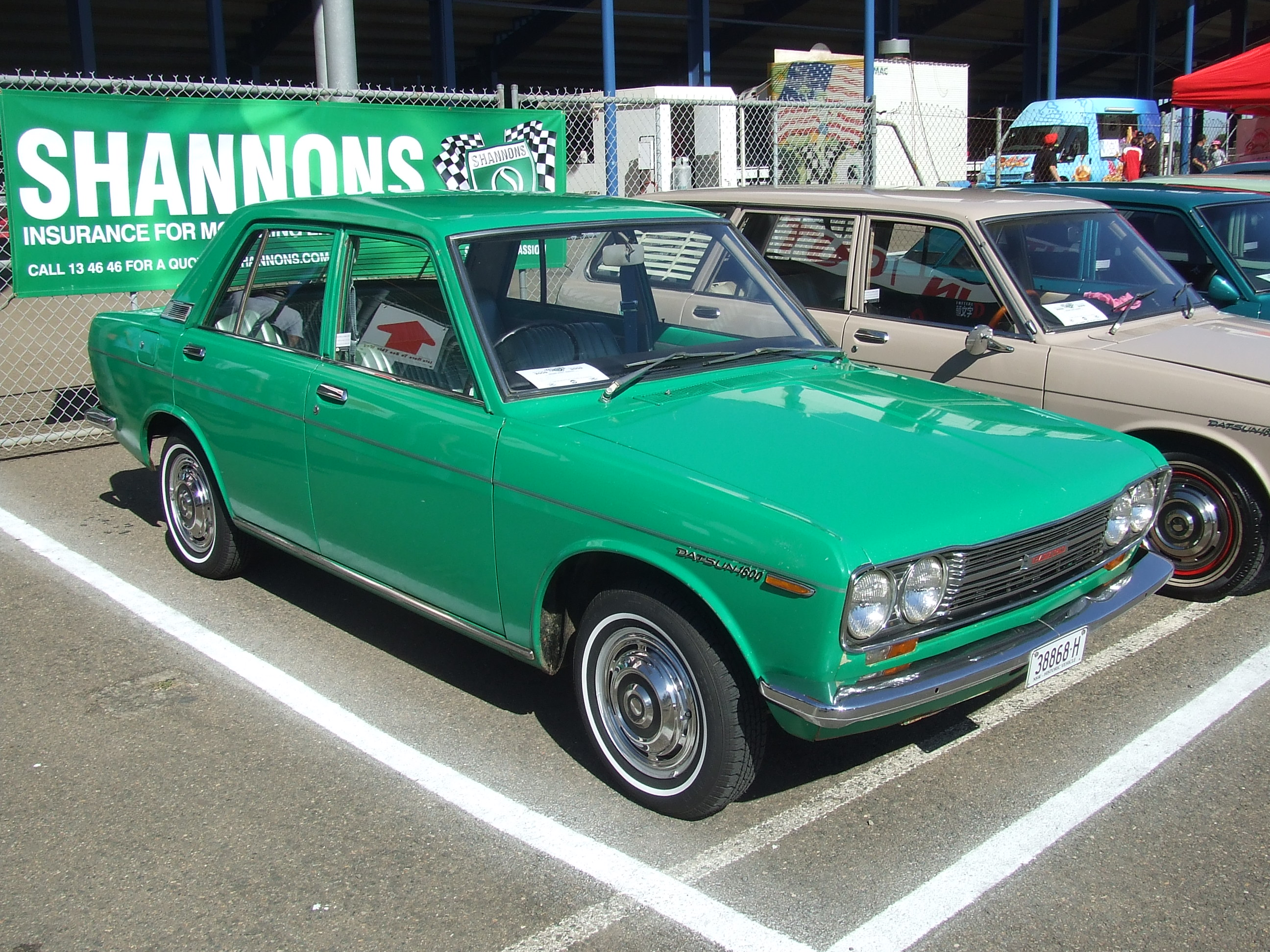
Datsun 1600 4-door

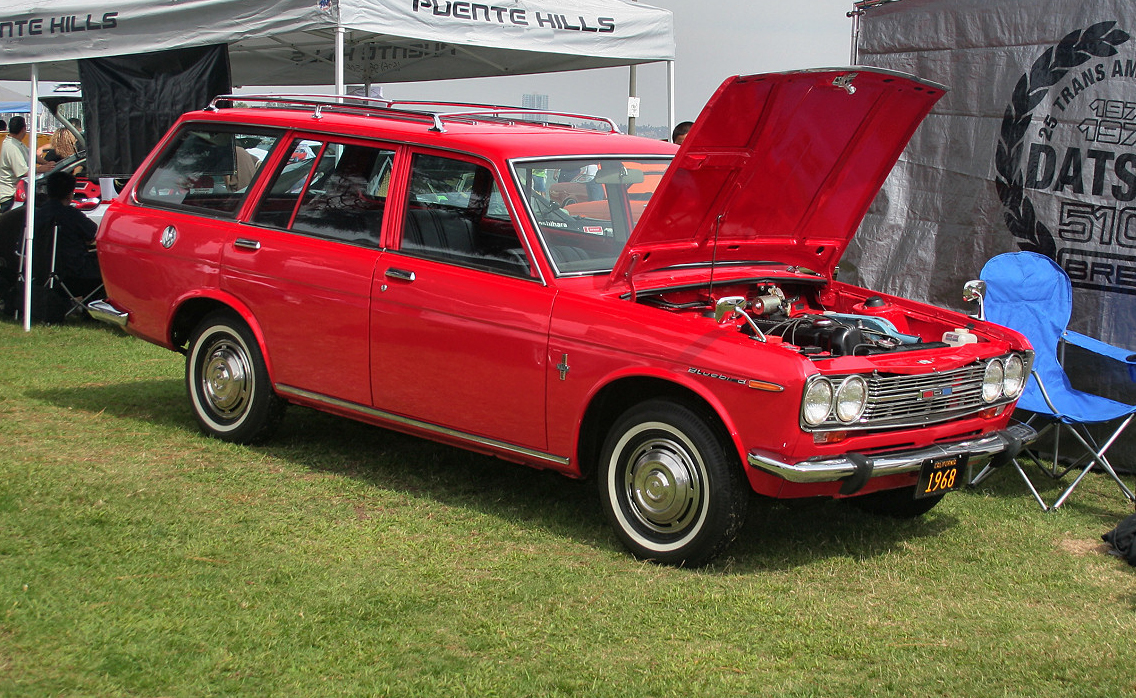
1968 Datsun Bluebird estate wagon

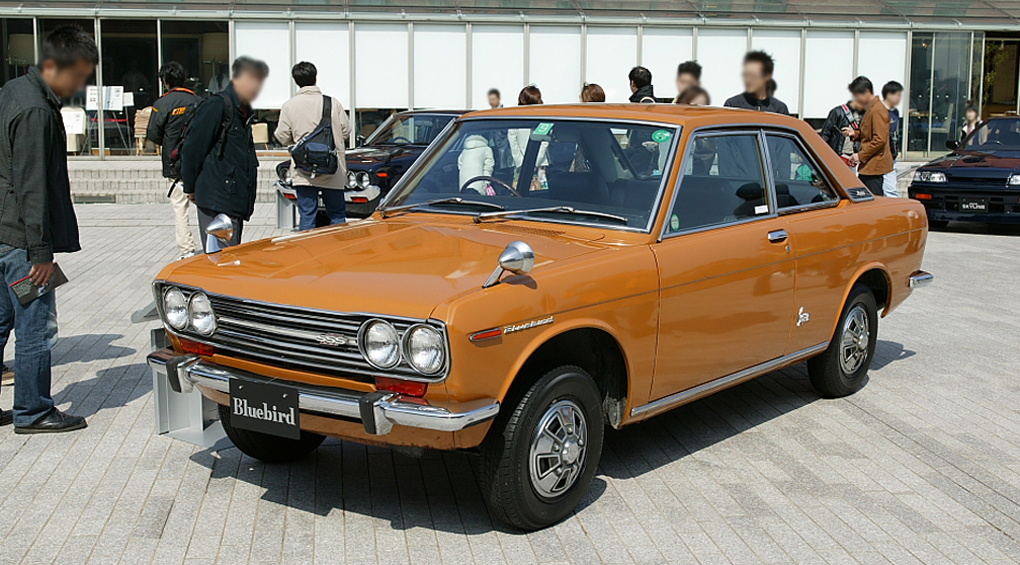
Datsun Bluebird SSS coupé (Japan)

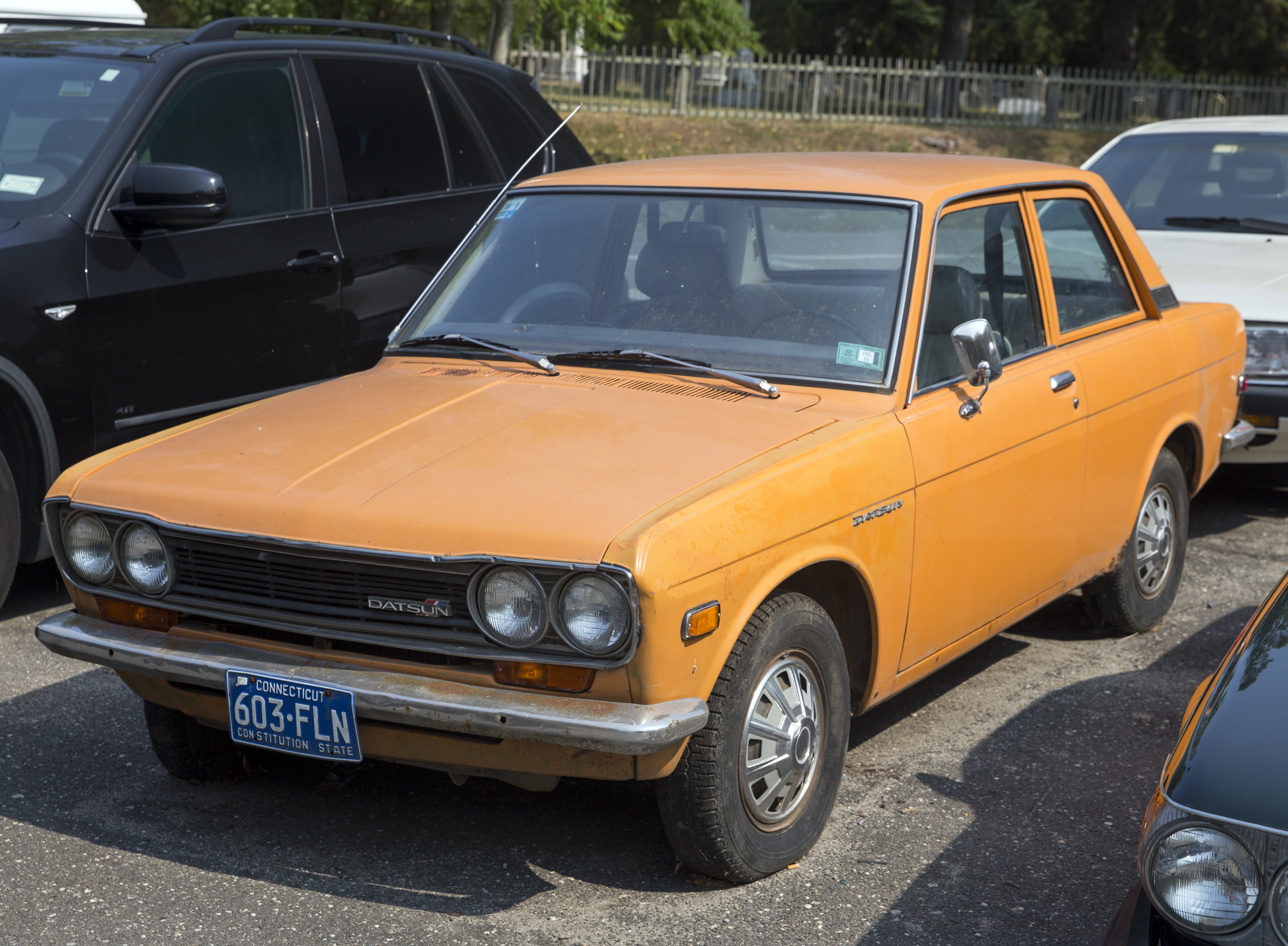
1970–1972 Datsun 510 2-door sedan (USA; first facelift)

=== Japan ===
When first shown, at the 1967 Tokyo Motor Show, Japanese customers received the overhead-camshaft 1.3-liter engine with a claimed 72 PS (53 kW) – according to Nissan, an engine more capable than competitor Toyota's 1.5-liter version. The little engine was not helped by being married to a three-speed manual gearbox. From the beginning, however, North American customers received the larger 1.6 coupled to a four-speed all-synchro transmission. Indeed, by October 1968 the Bluebird was made available with a 1600 cc engine to Japanese buyers as well. The 510-series Bluebirds differed widely depending on the market. In South America, Asia (excluding Japan), and in Africa, the 510 sedan, and two-door models traded rear independent suspension for a leaf-sprung solid axle. (All station wagon models were equipped with a solid axle). The engines for these markets also differed. Rather than the OHC L-series, they received pushrod inline four-cylinder engines from the J-series with either 1.3 or 1.5-liter displacement. These variants were also known as Datsun 1500 (J15 engine) and Datsun 1300 (J13 engine).

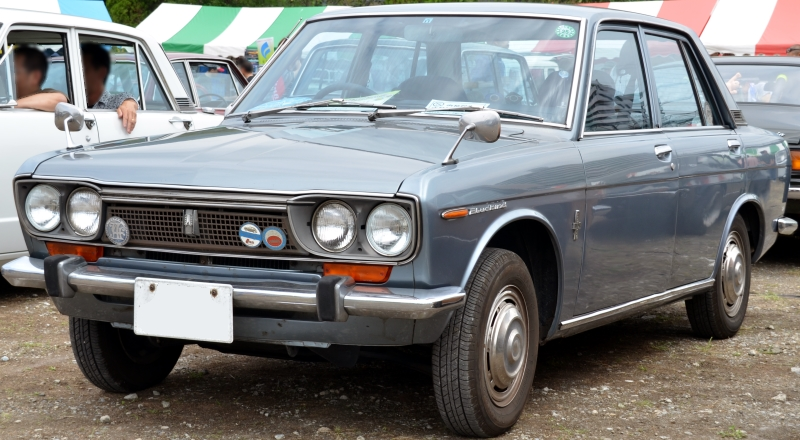
1972–1973 Datsun Bluebird 1400 Deluxe (510N, Japan)

In September 1970, the 1.3 and 1.5-liter engines were replaced with 1.4-liter units. In September 1971 the new, larger, Bluebird U (610) appeared in Japanese showrooms, but the 510 continued on sale as a lower-priced, more compact version. It also received a minor facelift with plastic surrounds for the headlamps, while the 1800 cc models were discontinued. The chassis code was changed to 510N.

=== North America ===
Originally only available as a four-door sedan or a station wagon for the 1968 model year, the two-door sedan saw a limited introduction during the summer of 1968 - making this the rarest U.S. 510 year and model. In Canada it was marketed as the Datsun 1600 rather than using the internal, "510" model code. The two-door sedan body style became popular and was imported into the U.S. and Canada in large numbers for the next five model years. The Datsun 510 released to the North American market had a Hitachi downdraft-carbureted 1.6-liter L-series straight-four engine, with an advertised gross power of 96 hp (72 kW), a claimed top speed of 100 mph, front disc brakes, four-wheel independent suspension (MacPherson struts in front and semi-trailing arms in rear), except the wagons, which used a rear solid live axle with leaf springs.

The 1968 510s are unique, with a stainless steel grille, inward pivoting wipers, small amber front turn signals, no rear side marker lights, and different taillights from later models (without chrome trim). For 1969, the grille was changed and now has an unpainted, stainless steel central section with rounder bars than those found the year before. The wide "DATSUN" text was replaced with an upright rectangle with a "D" in the middle. The windshield wipers were changed for a more traditional layout and round side marker lights were added at the rear. Larger taillights, all red with a small, white reversing lamp, were introduced and remained until the end of production. The interior saw minor changes; most importantly the ignition was moved onto the steering column. All North American model 510s received tinted glass from 1970 on.

In Canada and the U.S., unitized-body Datsun PL510 cars have become rare in the Rust Belt regions, but can still be seen in areas where corrosive materials are not generally used on the roads- such as Western and Southern States. The greatest numbers of the cars seem to be in the West Coast region, where Japanese cars first succeeded in the market.

=== Europe ===
The first European imports were delivered shortly after the announcement of the car in Japan, spearhead the brand there. UK imports were announced at the October 1968 Motor Show. The L16 saloons appeared first, joined shortly by the estate. L13 models arrived in early 1969, and a series of minor updates and equipment changes dictated by the US market followed. The L14 model replaced the L13 in October, 1970, and was imported with the L16 until May, 1972, when the car was replaced by the far more successful (in the UK) 610. Nissan imported about 4,000 510 models into the UK. Nissan established a proper dealer network around the time the 510 was discontinued, (Octav Botnar was instrumental in the massive success of the brand in the UK) so the 510 never really received the marketing nor recognition that was achieved in other countries. All official imports in the UK were either four-door saloons or estates.

=== Oceania ===
Australian versions of the Datsun 1600 were delivered either as a full import (1967 and early 1969), or assembled in Australia from local and Japanese parts. These 510 Datsuns were equipped with L16 engines. Australia officially received only the four-door sedan and station wagon models. The last of the P510 series went through Australian assembly lines in 1972, and due to the extensive use for rallying, the cars are now quite hard to find in any reasonable condition.

Nissan-Datsun New Zealand had the four-door manual sedans assembled locally from 1968, replacing two generations of Bluebirds (the name continued to be used in Japan and elsewhere) with the new 1600 export badge. Local content was about 40% and included glass, wiring, batteries, radiators, carpet and interior trim. Locally made radios were a dealer-fit accessory. The cars were built under contract at Campbell Motor Industries in Thames; the preceding Bluebird had been built at NZ Motor Bodies in Auckland. The 1968 1600s/510s had inward pivoting wipers and a rectangular speedometer; wipers soon were changed to a parallel action that cleared more glass, reversible for LHD versions. The 1970 facelift brought a new safety-style dashboard with recessed round dials, larger tail lamps with additional chrome trim in the lens, larger front combination lamps, increased bumper height, and detail changes to the grille. Automatic versions were a special import, built up, and only if (limited) import license was available, and a few SSS sedans were also imported fully assembled. The 1600, popular for modification and racing, not least due to its independent rear suspension (when contemporary rivals like the Ford Cortina and Toyota Corona had live, leaf-sprung rear axles), was replaced by the 180B in 1972, and was sought after used for many years afterwards.

=== South America ===
South American versions of the Datsun 510 were delivered with OHV pushrod engines of the J series variety and leaf spring suspensions (no IRS) on all models. Marketed as Datsun 1300 or Datsun 1500, depending on engine size.

=== Taiwan ===
The 510 was assembled in Taiwan as the Yue Loong Bluebird 706 and was powered by the J13 from the 411 and had leaf spring rear suspension.

=== South Africa ===
The P510-series Datsun 1600 was built in South Africa in Pretoria between 1969 and 1974 with sedan or coupé bodywork. This generation marked the end of the "Bluebird" badge there. The sedan was available as a 1600 DeLuxe, 1600 SSS, 1600GL, 1600GL SSS (L16 engine) and later as the 1800GL and SSS They all had independent rear suspension and the SSS version, introduced in July 1969, had twin carbs. Coupé models were 1600 GL and 1800 GL. The SSS has 109 hp (81 kW) SAE. These cars were very popular for motor sport in South Africa. The cars were used in numerous rallies by Ewold van Bergen from Pretoria, South Africa, who was a test engineer for Nissan Japan.

== Later years ==
The Datsun 510 model name continued in Canada and the U.S. from 1974 until 1981, but the vehicles which wore the badge were quite different from the original flagship 510s, with updated styling, solid rear axles, and rectangular headlights. The 1981 model had a 2.0L (L20B) engine rated at 96 HP. In 1982 the 510 was replaced by the (Nissan) Stanza.

In 2013 and 2014, Nissan showed the Nissan Freeflow IDX and NISMO IDX at various auto shows, said to be influenced by the Datsun 510.

== Motorsport ==
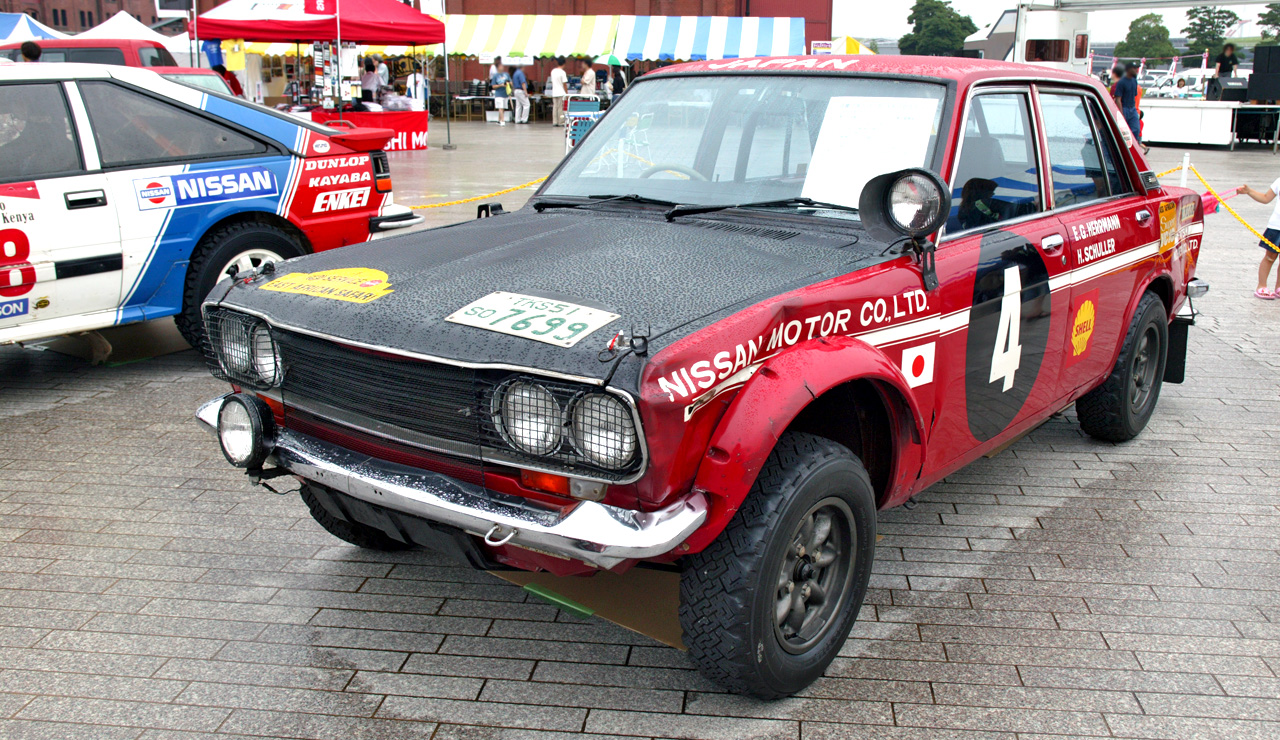
1970 Datsun Bluebird 510, the winning car of the 18th East African Safari Rally

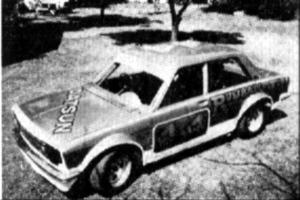
Australian Northern Territory Speedway Champion circa 1970 – Still holds records today

The 510 is best known in the United States for its competitiveness in the Trans Am Series under 2500cc class. John Morton won the 1971 and 1972 championships driving Pete Brock's BRE Racing 510. The Datsun 510 remains one of the most popular production cars in numerous SCCA classes of amateur racing, partly due to Nissan Motor Corporation in USA's commitment to providing an extensive selection of common replacement parts from its many area parts distribution centers, special replacement parts from their master parts distribution center (based in Los Angeles), as well as parts from Nissan Motorsports, Nissan's performance division (based in Tennessee). The Datsun 1600 was also very competitive in the Australian Rally Championship with outright and class wins throughout the 70s and the 80s and currently in historic classes.

=== Major motorsport victories ===
Event / Series	Year	Driver	Co-driver	Car
(Australia) Ampol Trial	1970	(Kenya) Edgar Herrmann	(Germany) Hans Schüller	Datsun 1600 SSS
(Kenya) East African Safari Rally	1970	(Kenya) Edgar Herrmann	(Germany) Hans Schüller	Datsun 1600 SSS
(United States) SCCA Trans Am 2.5 Championship	1972	(United States) John Morton	N/A	Datsun 510 2 door sedan
(Australia) Australian Rally Championship	1982	(Australia) Geoff Portman	(Australia) Ross Runnalls	Datsun 1600
(Australia) Australian Rally Championship	1983	(Australia) Ross Dunkerton	(Australia) Geoff Jones	Datsun 1600
