= Ross Dunkerton =

Australian rally driver (born 1945)

Ross Winston Dunkerton OAM (born 16 July 1945) is an Australian rally driver. Dunkerton is a five time winner of the Australian Rally Championship and two time winner of the Asia-Pacific Rally Championship. He was awarded a Medal of the Order of Australia in 2018.

Dunkerton is one of only three Australian rally drivers in history to achieve FIA A seeded status along side Chris Atkinson and Cody Crocker.

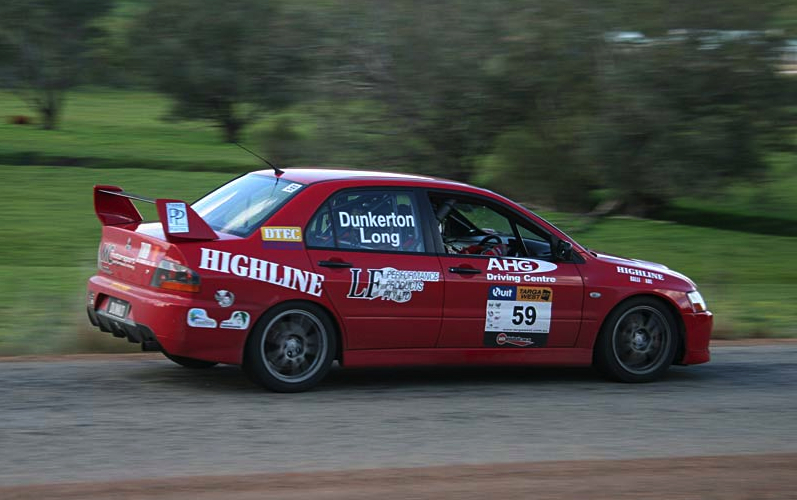
Ross Dunkerton in a Mitsubishi Lancer Evo IX

Dunkerton was awarded life membership of Motorsport Australia in 2011, inducted into the Australian Rally Hall of Fame in 2013 and the Australian Motor Sport Hall of Fame in 2016.

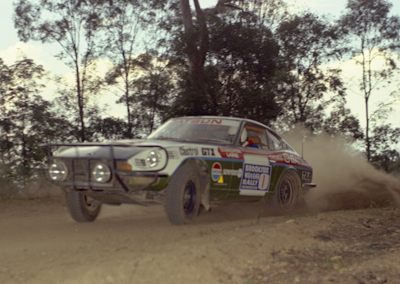
Ross Dunkerton in the Datsun 240Z which took him to his first Australian Rally Championship in 1975

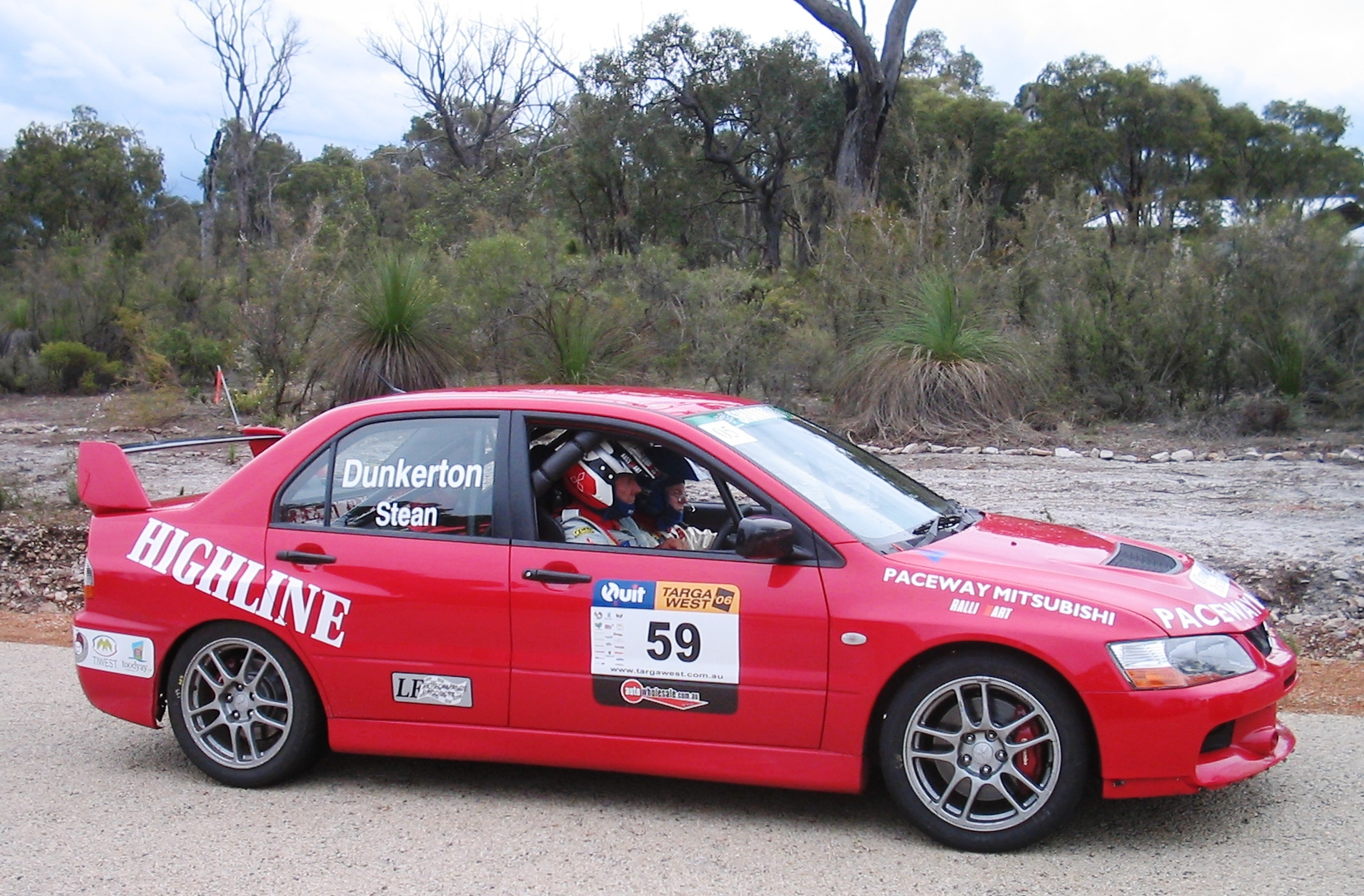
Ross Dunkerton in the 2006 Targa West rally

Dunkerton won the Asia-Pacific Rally Championship in 1991 and 1992 in a Mitsubishi Galant VR-4 as a full-time factory driver for Mitsubishi Ralliart. In Australia, he won the Australian Rally Championship in 1975, 1976, 1977, 1979 and 1983 in Datsun 1600s, 240Zs and 260Zs. Dunkerton also won the Southern Cross Rally in 1980. He won the 2005 and 2006 Targa West rallies, placing third in the 2007 event.

== Personal life ==
Born in Fremantle, Western Australia, he was previously a councillor for the Town of Bassendean, but moved with his family to Cairns in Far North Queensland in late 2007.

Ross is married to his wife Lisa has two sons, Aaron and Flynn.

== Career ==
Dunkerton is a regular competitor in numerous tarmac and historic gravel events in both Australia and New Zealand. He competed in the 2009 Otago Rally of New Zealand in his newly purchased MK II BDA Ford Escort rally car.

Dunkerton is one of only two Australian drivers to have ever stood on a podium of a World Rally Championship event, the other being Chris Atkinson. In 1992, Dunkerton finished third in the Rally New Zealand, round 7 of the 1992 World Rally Championship.

== Television presenting ==
Dunkerton turned his hand to full-time television presenting in 1995.

Dunkerton has taken on many roles, his most current being a full-time presenter for the Western Australian lifestyle show, Home in WA and the automotive series, Zoom TV. He has also presented coverage for a variety of motorsport events including the Variety Club Bash and coverage of the Australian Rally Championship on Network 10.

== Career results ==
Season	Series	Position	Car	Team
1974	Australian Rally Championship	3rd	Datsun 240Z	Nissan Motor Australia
1975	Australian Rally Championship	1st	Datsun 240Z	Nissan Motor Australia
1976	Australian Rally Championship	1st	Datsun 260Z	Nissan Motor Australia
1977	Australian Rally Championship	1st	Datsun 260Z	Nissan Motor Australia
1977	Safari Calédonien	1st	Datsun Violet 710	
1977	London–Sydney Marathon	5th	Peugeot 504 TI	Channel TVW7 Perth; Australian Peugeot Team
1978	Australian Rally Championship	2nd	Datsun Violet 710	Nissan Motor Australia
1979	Australian Rally Championship	1st	Datsun Stanza	Nissan Motor Australia
1979	Repco Round Australia Trial	4th	Volvo 244 GT	Volvo Dealer Team Queensland
1980	Australian Rally Championship	3rd	Datsun Stanza	Nissan Motor Australia
1981	Australian Rally Championship	3rd	Datsun Stanza	Nissan Motor Australia
1983	Australian Rally Championship	1st	Datsun 1600	
1985	Himalayan Rally	2nd	Subaru 4x4 Turbo	
1987	Malaysian Rally Championship	1st	Ford Laser TX3 4WD	
1987	FIA Far East Rally Championship	1st	Ford Laser TX3 4WD; Mitsubishi Starion Turbo	
1988	Malaysian Rally Championship	2nd	Ford Laser TX3 4WD	
1989	World Rally Championship	64th	Mitsubishi Galant VR-4	Mitsubishi Ralliart
1989	Asia-Pacific Rally Championship	2nd	Mitsubishi Galant VR-4	Mitsubishi Ralliart
1989	Australian Rally Championship	5th	Mitsubishi Galant VR-4	Mitsubishi Ralliart
1990	World Rally Championship	20th	Mitsubishi Galant VR-4	Mitsubishi Ralliart
1991	Asia-Pacific Rally Championship	1st	Mitsubishi Galant VR-4	Mitsubishi Ralliart
1991	Australian Rally Championship	6th	Mitsubishi Galant VR-4	Mitsubishi Ralliart
1991	World Rally Championship	40th	Mitsubishi Galant VR-4	Mitsubishi Ralliart
1992	Asia-Pacific Rally Championship	1st	Mitsubishi Galant VR-4	Mitsubishi Ralliart
1992	Australian Rally Championship	7th	Mitsubishi Galant VR-4	Mitsubishi Ralliart
1992	World Rally Championship	16th	Mitsubishi Galant VR-4	Mitsubishi Ralliart
1992	Malaysian Rally Championship	1st	Mitsubishi Galant VR-4	Team Shell – Mitsubishi
1993	Australian Rally Championship	7th	Mitsubishi Lancer RS-E	Mitsubishi Ralliart
1993	World Rally Championship	24th	Mitsubishi Lancer RS-E	Mitsubishi Ralliart
1994	Australian Rally Championship	2nd	Mitsubishi Galant VR-4	
1995	London – Mexico Rally	2nd	Datsun 240Z	Dunkerton/Mansson
2004	Australian Rally Championship – P5 Class	1st	Mitsubishi Magna	Mitsubishi Australia

=== Complete WRC results ===
Year	Entrant	Car	1	2	3	4	5	6	7	8	9	10	11	12	13	14	WDC	Points
1989	Mitsubishi Ralliart Europe	Mitsubishi Galant VR-4	SWE	MON	POR	KEN	FRA	GRC	NZL; 9	ARG	FIN	AUS; Ret	ITA	CIV	GBR		64th	2
1990	Mitsubishi Ralliart Europe	Mitsubishi Galant VR-4	MON	POR	KEN	FRA	GRC	NZL; 4	ARG	FIN	AUS; Ret	ITA	CIV	GBR			20th	10
1991	Mitsubishi Ralliart Europe	Mitsubishi Galant VR-4	MON	SWE	POR	KEN	FRA	GRE	NZL; Ret	ARG	FIN	AUS; 7	ITA	CIV	ESP	GBR	40th	4
1992	Mitsubishi Ralliart Europe	Mitsubishi Galant VR-4	MON	SWE	POR	KEN	FRA	GRC	NZL; 3	ARG	FIN	AUS; 5	ITA	CIV	ESP	GBR	16th	20

Sporting positions
Preceded by Colin Bond	Australian Rally Champion; 1975–1977 (titled shared with George Fury in 1977)	Succeeded by Greg Carr
Preceded by Greg Carr	Australian Rally Champion; 1979	Succeeded by George Fury
Preceded by Geoff Portman	Australian Rally Champion; 1983	Succeeded by David Officer
Preceded by Carlos Sainz	Asia-Pacific Rally Champion; 1991–1992	Succeeded by Possum Bourne
