= 1973 Southern Cross Rally =

1973 Southern Cross Rally The Sun-Total Oil Southern Cross International Rally
- Host country: Australia
- Rally base: Sydney; Port Macquarie
- Dates run: 3 – 7 October 1973
- Stages: 40 (1,822.70 km; 1,132.57 miles)
- Stage surface: Tarmac and Gravel
- Overall distance: 3,245.70 km (2,016.78 miles)

Statistics
- Crews: 71 at start, 38 at finish

Overall results
- Overall winner: (United Kingdom) Andrew Cowan; John Bryson; Mitsubishi (Australia) Pty Ltd

The 1973 Southern Cross Rally, officially the Sun-Total Oil Southern Cross International Rally was the eighth running of the Southern Cross Rally. The rally took place between the 3rd and the 7th of October 1973. The event covered 3,245 kilometres from Sydney to Port Macquarie. It was won by Andrew Cowan and John Bryson, driving a Mitsubishi Lancer GSR.

== Results ==
Pos	No	Entrant	Drivers	Car	Penalties (Points)
1	5	Mitsubishi Motor Corporation Australia	(United Kingdom) Andrew Cowan (Australia) John Bryson	Mitsubishi Lancer GSR	193.25
2	16	Mitsubishi Motor Corporation Australia	(Australia) Barry Ferguson (Australia) Wayne Gregson	Mitsubishi Lancer GSR	219
3	3	Mitsubishi Motor Corporation Australia	(Australia) Doug Chivas (Australia) Peter Meyer	Mitsubishi Lancer GSR	225.75
4	9	Mitsubishi Motor Corporation Australia	(Kenya) Joginder Singh (Australia) Garry Connelly	Mitsubishi Lancer GSR	247.25
5	74	(Australia) Garry & Warren Smith-Holden Dealer Team	(Australia) Colin Bond (Australia) George Shepheard	Holden Torana LJ XU-1	264
6	8	Nissan Motor Company (Australia)	(Australia) Frank Kilfoyle (Australia) Mike Osborne	Datsun 180B SSS	281.50
7	22	(Australia) Bob Riley	(Australia) Bob Riley (Australia) Adrian Van Loon	Mitsubishi Galant	366
8	17	Nissan Motor Company (Australia)	(Australia) Bob Watson (Australia) Jeff Beaumont	Datsun 240Z	372
9	21	(Australia) Tynan Motors P/L	(Australia) Charlie Lund (Australia) Nigel Collier	Mazda RX-3	570.50
10	30	(Australia) W.E. Evans	(Australia) Bill Evans (Australia) Mike Mitchell	Datsun 1200	726.25
11	41	(Australia) Ross Dunkerton	(Australia) Ross Dunkerton (Australia) John Large	Datsun 180B SSS	818.50
12	31	(Australia) Des West	(Australia) Des West (Australia) Richard McMaster	Holden Torana LJ XU-1	819.50
13	28	(Australia) Shoesmiths	(Australia) Allan Lawson (Australia) Murray Coote	Datsun 1200	951
14	42	(Australia) Provincial Motors	(Australia) Jim Laing-Peach (Australia) Barry Lake	Subaru Leone GSR	1237.50
15	43	(Australia) B.G. Bell	(Australia) Brian Bell (Australia) Dr. Brian McGuirk	Datsun 1600	1340.75
16	2	Nissan Motor Company (Australia)	(Kenya) Shekhar Mehta (Australia) Roger Bonhomme	Datsun 240Z	1936
17	53	(Australia) D.E. Beasley	(Australia) David Beasley (Australia) Geoff Sykes	Datsun 1600	2152.75
18	59	(Australia) Barry Smith Toyota	(Australia) Gary Meehan (Australia) Graham Gillies	Toyota Corolla	2827.75
19	27	(Australia) Helmut Goetz	(Australia) Helmut Goetz (Australia) Peter McFadzean	Datsun 180B SSS	3519.75
20	71	(Australia) Bega Valley Team	(Australia) Neil Weston (Australia) Peter Berriman	Datsun 1600	3576.75
21	50	(Australia) Dr. J. Munro	(Australia) John Munro (Australia) Wal Harris	Datsun 1600	3741.75
22	32	(Australia) Col Parry	(Australia) Col Parry (Australia) S. Pearce	Holden Torana LJ XU-1	3952.25
23	44	(Australia) Bega Valley Team	(Australia) Mark Hankinson (Australia) Max Roberts	Datsun 1600	4121
24	70	(Australia) C.L. O'Brien	(Australia) Charles O'Brien (Australia) Des Dunstan	Holden Torana LJ GTR	4205.25
25	58	(Australia) N.K. Morris	(Australia) Keith Morris (Australia) John Fell	Datsun 1600	4267.75
26	39	(Australia) Bega Valley Team	(Australia) Bob Moore (Australia) Ron Wiebe	Mitsubishi Galant	4347.75
27	54	(Australia) Maurie Quincey	(Australia) Lynne Jarman (Australia) Lyn Stanley	Honda Civic	4378.25
28	37	(Australia) Bennett Honda	(Australia) Geoff Ross (Australia) Bruce Partridge	Honda Civic	4767.75
29	48	(Australia) Christian Autosports Club	(Australia) George Kahler (Australia) Richard Denny	Mazda RX-2 Coupe	4800.75
30	57	(Australia) Erl Calver	(Australia) Erl Calver (Australia) Merv Gillies	Holden Torana LJ XU-1	4825.50
31	56	(Australia) Bennett Honda	(Australia) John Blanchard (Australia) Fritz Suendermann	Honda Civic	5239.75
32	67	(Australia) S. Mulholland	(Australia) Gwyn Mulholland (Australia) Wally Pywell	Datsun 1600	5922.25
33	46	(Australia) Tynan Motors P/L	(Australia) Brian McIlvenna (Australia) Polly Ashworth	Mazda 1200	6095.25
34	45	(Australia) Robert Kahl	(Australia) Robert Kahl (Australia) James Kahl	Holden Torana LJ XU-1	7930
35	52	(Australia) North Shore Sporting Car Club	(Australia) Richard Hill (Australia) Sonja Kable-Cumming	Leyland P76	8121.25
36	72	(Australia) Ron Cross	(Australia) Ron Cross (Australia) Barbara Hellwig	Holden Torana LJ XU-1	8972.75
37	73	(Australia) Dennis Lloyd	(Australia) Dennis Lloyd (Australia) Colin Mate	Morris Cooper S	12046.75
38	68	(Australia) K.W. Leslie	(Australia) Keith Leslie (Australia) John Humphreys	Morris Cooper S	14849.50
