= 1974 Southern Cross Rally =

1974 Southern Cross Rally The Sun-Total Oil Southern Cross International Rally
- Host country: Australia
- Rally base: Sydney; Port Macquarie
- Dates run: 9 – 13 October 1974
- Stages: 48 (1,919.60 km; 1,192.78 miles)
- Stage surface: Tarmac and Gravel
- Overall distance: 3,506.37 km (2,178.76 miles)

Statistics
- Crews: 61 at start, 7 at finish

Overall results
- Overall winner: (United Kingdom) Andrew Cowan; John Bryson; Mitsubishi (Australia) Pty Ltd

The 1974 Southern Cross Rally, officially the Sun-Total Oil Southern Cross International Rally was the ninth running of the Southern Cross Rally. The rally took place between the 9th and the 13th of October 1974. The event covered 3,506 kilometres from Sydney to Port Macquarie. It was won by Andrew Cowan and John Bryson, driving a Mitsubishi Lancer GSR.

== Results ==
| Pos | No | Entrant | Drivers | Car | Penalties (Points) |
|---|---|---|---|---|---|
| 1 | 9 | Mitsubishi (Australia) Pty Ltd | (United Kingdom) Andrew Cowan (Australia) John Bryson | Mitsubishi Lancer GSR | 209 |
| 2 | 1 | Mitsubishi (Australia) Pty Ltd | (Kenya) Joginder Singh (Australia) Garry Connelly | Mitsubishi Lancer GSR | 272 |
| 3 | 22 | (Japan) Tatsuo Yaginuma | (Japan) Tatsuo Yaginuma (Japan) Haruo Okada | Toyota Trueno | 441 |
| 4 | 18 | Nissan Motor Australia | (Australia) George Fury (Australia) Monty Suffern | Datsun 180B SSS | 1051 |
| 5 | 14 | Nissan Motor Australia | (Japan) Yoshio Iwashita (Japan) Nobuhiro Yasuoka | Datsun 710 SSS | 2021 |
| 6 | 31 | (Australia) Robert Jackson | (Australia) Robert Jackson (Australia) Ross Jackson | Holden Torana LJ XU-1 | 2528 |
| 7 | 38 | (Australia) Dr. J. Munro | (Australia) John Munro (Australia) Wal Harris | Datsun 1600 | 3708 |
