= 1976 Southern Cross Rally =

1976 Southern Cross Rally Total Oil Southern Cross International Rally
- Host country: Australia
- Rally base: Sydney; Port Macquarie
- Dates run: 9 – 14 October 1976
- Stages: 48 (2,132.50 km; 1,325.07 miles)
- Stage surface: Tarmac and Gravel
- Overall distance: 3,334.41 km (2,071.91 miles)

Statistics
- Crews: 88 at start, 22 at finish

Overall results
- Overall winner: (United Kingdom) Andrew Cowan; Fred Gocentas; Mitsubishi (Australia) Pty Ltd

The 1976 Southern Cross Rally, officially the Total Oil Southern Cross International Rally was the eleventh running of the Southern Cross Rally. The rally took place between the 9th and the 14th of October 1976. The event covered 3,334 kilometres from Sydney to Port Macquarie. It was won by Andrew Cowan and Fred Gocentas, driving a Mitsubishi Lancer GSR.

== Results ==
Pos	No	Entrant	Drivers	Car	Penalties (Points)
1	6	Mitsubishi (Australia) Pty Ltd	(United Kingdom) Andrew Cowan (Australia) Fred Gocentas	Mitsubishi Lancer GSR	157
2	9	Mitsubishi (Australia) Pty Ltd	(Australia) Barry Ferguson (Australia) Neil Faulkner	Mitsubishi Lancer GSR	203
3	4	Nissan Motor Australia	(Kenya) Shekhar Mehta (Australia) Adrian Mortimer	Datsun 710 SSS	205
4	19	Mitsubishi (Australia) Pty Ltd	(Australia) Doug Stewart (Australia) John Dawson-Damer	Mitsubishi Lancer GSR	271
5	14	Mitsubishi (Australia) Pty Ltd	(Japan) Kenjiro Shinozuka (Australia) Garry Connelly	Mitsubishi Lancer GSR	324
6	16	Nissan Motor Australia	(Sweden) Per-Inge Walfridsson (Australia) Peter Godden	Datsun 710 SSS	348
7	34	(Australia) I.W. Hill	(Australia) Ian Hill (Australia) Graham Roser	Mitsubishi Lancer	391
8	27	(Australia) David Bond	(Australia) David Bond (Australia) Ian Richards	Mitsubishi Lancer	418
9	31	(Australia) Murray Coote	(Australia) Murray Coote (Australia) Brian Marsden	Datsun 1200	437
10	28	(Australia) A. Crawford	(Australia) Peter Janson (Australia) Paul Paterson	Mitsubishi Lancer GSR	453
11	64	(Australia) B.E. Clark	(Australia) Brian Clark (Australia) Peter Hardy	Mitsubishi Galant	561
12	46	(Japan) Mitso Ayabe	(Japan) Mitso Ayabe (Japan) Shigeru Imai	Toyota Trueno	670
13	48	(Australia) Gary Meehan	(Australia) Gary Meehan (Australia) Martin Fell	Toyota Corolla	688
14	2	Ford Motor Company of Australia	(United Kingdom) Roger Clark (United Kingdom) Jim Porter	Ford Escort RS 1800 Mark II	855
15	25	(Australia) Jim Reddiex	(Australia) Jim Reddiex (Australia) Greg Sked	Citroën CX2200	1069
16	58	(Australia) Dr. J. Munro	(Australia) John Munro (Australia) Wal Harris	Datsun 180B	1146
17	51	(Australia) David Balmain	(Australia) David Balmain (Australia) Guenter Nowacki	Mitsubishi Lancer	1355
18	53	(Japan) Hideya Satoh	(Japan) Hideya Satoh (Japan) Tarao Mitsuaki	Mitsubishi Lancer	1805
19	65	(Japan) Akira Tezuna	(Japan) Akira Tezuna (Japan) Yukio Iwashita	Mitsubishi Lancer	1942
20	69	(Australia) W.C. Adams Racing	(Australia) Bill Adams (Australia) Keith Snowball	Holden Torana LJ XU-1	2530
21	20	(Australia) Brut Team Alfa	(Australia) Evan Green (Australia) John Bryson	Alfa Romeo Alfetta GT	2905
22	76	Team Route 6 Japan	(Japan) Hisashi Shimura (Japan) Kazuo Takahashi	Honda Civic	4935
