= 1978 Southern Cross Rally =

1978 Southern Cross Rally Southern Cross International Rally
Round 15 of the 1978 FIA Cup for Rally Drivers
← Previous event	Next event →
- Host country: Australia
- Rally base: Sydney; Port Macquarie
- Dates run: 14 – 18 October 1978
- Stages: 34 (1,505.81 km; 935.67 miles)
- Stage surface: Tarmac and Gravel
- Overall distance: 2,727.81 km (1,694.98 miles)

Statistics
- Crews: 57 at start, 22 at finish

Overall results
- Overall winner: George Fury; Monty Suffern; Nissan Motor Australia

The 1978 Southern Cross Rally, officially the Southern Cross International Rally was the thirteenth running of the Southern Cross Rally and the fifteenth round of the 1978 FIA Cup for Rally Drivers. The rally took place between the 14th and the 18th of October 1978. The event covered 2,727 kilometres from Sydney to Port Macquarie. It was won by George Fury and Monty Suffern, driving a Datsun Stanza.

== Results ==
Pos	No	Entrant	Drivers	Car	Penalties (Time)
1	6	Nissan Motor Australia	(Australia) George Fury (Australia) Monty Suffern	Datsun Stanza	1hr 25min 17sec
2	7	Ford Motor Company of Australia	(Australia) Colin Bond (Australia) John Dawson-Damer	Ford Escort RS 1800 Mark II	1hr 37min 12sec
3	8	(Australia) Marlboro Holden Dealer Team	(Australia) Wayne Bell (Australia) George Shepheard	Holden Gemini PF60	1hr 58min 32sec
4	5	Nissan Motor Australia	(Australia) Ross Dunkerton (Australia) Adrian Mortimer	Datsun Stanza	2hr 17min 42sec
5	23	(Australia) Gosford Dyno Tune-Rallyequip	(Australia) Frank Neale (Australia) Phil Dodd	Mitsubishi Lancer	3hr 18min 50sec
6	14	(Japan) Team Crystal Rallyequip	(Japan) Shigeru Kanno (Japan) Kiyoshi Kawamura	Mitsubishi Lancer	3hr 37min 39sec
7	22	(Japan) Team Crystal Rallyequip	(Japan) Shinya Yamauchi (Japan) Toshiaki Fukui	Toyota Levin TE25	3hr 38min 10sec
8	12	(Australia) Gosford Dyno Tune-Rallyequip	(Australia) Ian Hill (Australia) Ann Heaney	Mitsubishi Lancer	4hr 0min 6sec
9	9	(Australia) Gosford Dyno Tune-Rallyequip	(Australia) Mike Bell (Australia) Peter Pattenden	Mitsubishi Lancer	4hr 22min 35sec
10	9	(Japan) Team Crystal Rallyequip	(Japan) Mitsuo Ayabe (Japan) Mamoru Namiki	Toyota Levin TE47	4hr 33min 16sec
11	33	(Australia) Bob Moore	(Australia) Bob Moore (Australia) Graeme Pigram	Mitsubishi Galant	4hr 55min 33sec
12	15	(Australia) Bruce Cheeseman	(Australia) Bruce Cheeseman (Australia) Allan Horsley	Mitsubishi Lancer	5hr 1min 38sec
13	42	(Australia) Stephen Blair	(Australia) Stephen Blair (Australia) Ross Ferguson	Datsun 180B SSS	5hr 30min 19sec
14	24	(Australia) Stones Corner Motors	(Australia) Henk Kabel (Australia) Simon Kabel	Mazda 323	6hr 0min 26sec
15	25	(Australia) Apex Batteries Pty Ltd	(Australia) Garry Meehan (Australia) Graham Roser	Toyota Celica RA40	6hr 8min 30sec
16	50	(Japan) Team Crystal Rallyequip	(Japan) Toshihisa Akimoto (Japan) Katsuhisa Torita	Mitsubishi Lancer	6hr 8min 48sec
17	53	(Australia) Route 6 Japan	(Australia) Wayne Griffiths (Japan) Tooru Tsunoda	Honda Civic	6hr 22min 26sec
18	37	(Japan) Minoru Yoneda	(Japan) Minoru Yoneda (Japan) Yoichiro Yamazaki	Isuzu Gemini PF60	6hr 29min 15sec
19	32	(Japan) Team Crystal Rallyequip	(Japan) Masakazu Wakamatsu (Japan) Takashi Yufube	Datsun Bluebird H510	6hr 55min 31sec
20	35	(Philippines) Arthur Tuason	(Philippines) Arthur Tuason (Philippines) Bou Saycon	Ford Escort RS 2000 Mark II	6hr 59min 39sec
21	39	(Australia) Pacific Ford	(Australia) John Bryson (Australia) Sonya Kable-Cumming	Ford Escort RS 2000 Mark II	7hr 16min 7sec
22	53	(Philippines) Juan Pascual	(Philippines) Juan Pascual (Philippines) Ernesto Echauz	Toyota Corolla TE20	8hr 24min 6sec
