= E20 =

E20 or E-20 may refer to:

- E20 fuel, a mixture of 20% ethanol and 80% gasoline
- European route E20
- Tandberg E20, a videoconferencing system
- E20, a postcode district in the E postcode area, announced in March 2011 for use on the site of the 2012 Olympics
- London E20 (EastEnders), a fictional London postal district in EastEnders
- EastEnders: E20, an Internet spin-off from EastEnders - also shown on BBC Three
- E20 (nightclub), a fictional nightclub in EastEnders
- Enterprise 2.0
- Lotus E20, a Formula One racing car from Lotus F1 Team for the 2012 season
- Toyota Corolla (E20), a car
- General Electric E-20, the largest model of GE's Elec-Trak electric tractor, arguably equivalent to a small 20 hp fossil-fueled tractor
- Nimzo-Indian Defense, Encyclopaedia of Chess Openings code
- Chūō Expressway (between Takaido IC and Okaya JCT on main route), route E20 in Japan
- Maju Expressway, route E20 in Malaysia
