= E15 =

E15, E-15, E.15 or E 15 may refer to:

== Places ==
- European route E15
- E15, a district in the London, England E postcode area
- E15, a numeronym for the Eyjafjallajökull volcano in Iceland
- E15, the MIT Media Lab building
- Monzen-Nakachō Station of the Toei Subway (station number T-12/E-15)
- Butterworth–Kulim Expressway, route E15 in Malaysia

== Technology ==
- HMS E15, a World War I-era United Kingdom Royal Navy submarine
- E15 fuel
- E15, a model rocket motor classification
- E15 (software), a scriptable OpenGL interface to web content
- General Electric E-15, an Elec-Trak electric tractor

== Other uses ==
- E15 (newspaper), Czech business daily
- E 15: 10^{15}, see Peta-
- E -15: 10^{−15}, see femto-
- Queen's Indian Defense (Encyclopaedia of Chess Openings code)
