= 1979 Southern Cross Rally =

1979 Southern Cross Rally Southern Cross International Rally
- Host country: Australia
- Rally base: Sydney; Port Macquarie
- Dates run: 13 – 17 October 1979
- Stages: 38 (1,563.72 km; 971.65 miles)
- Stage surface: Tarmac and Gravel
- Overall distance: 2,733.73 km (1,698.66 miles)

Statistics
- Crews: 40 at start, 17 at finish

Overall results
- Overall winner: George Fury; Monty Suffern; Nissan Motor Australia

The 1979 Southern Cross Rally, officially the Southern Cross International Rally was the fourteenth running of the Southern Cross Rally. The rally took place between the 13th and the 17th of October 1979. The event covered 2,733 kilometres from Sydney to Port Macquarie. It was won by George Fury and Monty Suffern, driving a Datsun Stanza.

== Results ==
Pos	No	Entrant	Drivers	Car	Overall Time
1	6	Nissan Motor Australia	(Australia) George Fury (Australia) Monty Suffern	Datsun Stanza	20hr 36min 9sec
2	4	Nissan Motor Australia	(Australia) Ross Dunkerton (Australia) Jeff Beaumont	Datsun Stanza	20hr 49min 20sec
3	2	Nissan Motor Australia	(Finland) Rauno Aaltonen (Australia) Adrian Mortimer	Datsun Stanza	21hr 53min 53sec
4	5	Ford Motor Company of Australia	(Australia) Colin Bond (Australia) John Dawson-Damer	Ford Escort RS 1800 Mark II	22hr 5min 19sec
5	15	(Australia) Frank Johnston	(Australia) Frank Johnston (Australia) Stephen Vanderbyl	Mazda RX-3	23hr 18min 13sec
6	16	(Japan) Nobuhiro Tajima	(Japan) Nobuhiro Tajima (Japan) Shoichu Hara	Toyota Levin TE25	23hr 32min 26sec
7	10	(Australia) J. Parry	(Australia) Doug Stewart (Australia) Col Parry	Holden Commodore VB	23hr 41min 35sec
8	18	(Australia) Cascade Motors	(Australia) Gordon Leven (Australia) Robert Wilson	Datsun 1600 SSS	23hr 46min 30sec
9	9	(Australia) Autosport	(Australia) Geoff Portman (Australia) Ross Runnalls	Ford Cortina TE	24hr 5min 36sec
10	20	(Australia) Ron Marks	(Australia) Ron Marks (Australia) Chris Heaney	Datsun 120Y	24hr 36min 41sec
11	55	(Australia) Australian Sporting Car Club	(Australia) Steve Blair (Australia) Ross Ferguson	Datsun Stanza	24hr 37min 9sec
12	17	(Australia) Leon Progmet	(Australia) Gary Mecak (Australia) Graham Gillies	Mazda RX-2	24hr 44min 29sec
13	43	(Australia) Edward Knowles	(Australia) Edward Knowles (Australia) David Officer	Ford Escort RS2000 Mark II	25hr 27min 18sec
14	30	(Australia) P.R. Bramble	(Australia) Paul Bramble (Australia) Arthur Evans	Mitsubishi Galant	25hr 40min 43sec
15	34	(Australia) Deepwater Sporting Car Club	(Australia) Ron Cremen (Australia) Alan Brooke	Datsun 120Y	25hr 57min 11sec
16	24	(Japan) Eiichi Suzuki	(Japan) Eiichi Suzuki (Japan) Takashi Yafune	Mitsubishi Lancer	26hr 12min 39sec
17	50	(Australia) North Shore Sporting Car Club	(Australia) Jim Casey (Australia) Les Oliver	Ford Escort RS2000 Mark II	26hr 37min 43sec
