= I5 =

I5, I-5 or I 5 may refer to:

== Computing ==
- Intel Core i5, a brand of microprocessors
- i5, an IBM AS/400 line of minicomputers
  - i5/OS, previous name of the IBM i operating system

== Military ==
- Japanese submarine I-5, a 1931 Junsen type submarine
- Polikarpov I-5, a Soviet fighter biplane of the 1930s
- I 5, a Swedish regimental designation (5th Infantry Regiment) that has been used by the following units:
  - 2nd Life Grenadier Regiment (1816–1927)
  - Jämtland Ranger Regiment (1928–1974, 1990–1994, 2000–2004)

== Transportation ==
- Interstate 5 (I-5), a US highway
- Inline-five engine, or straight-five engine
- AirAsia India (IATA code)
- General Electric I-5, the "industrial" model of GE's Elec-Trak electric tractor
- The electric version of the BMW 5 series, BMW i5

== Other uses ==
- I5 (girl group), American band in 2000-2001
- Inferior Five, fictional superhero group from DC Comics

== See also ==
- iPhone 5, an Apple smartphone
- 5I (disambiguation)
