= 1975 Southern Cross Rally =

1975 Southern Cross Rally Total Oil Southern Cross International Rally
- Host country: Australia
- Rally base: Sydney; Port Macquarie
- Dates run: 8 – 12 October 1975
- Stages: 48 (1,348.19 km; 837.73 miles)
- Stage surface: Tarmac and Gravel
- Overall distance: 3,367.73 km (2,092.61 miles)

Statistics
- Crews: 79 at start, 30 at finish

Overall results
- Overall winner: (United Kingdom) Andrew Cowan; Fred Gocentas; Mitsubishi (Australia) Pty Ltd

The 1975 Southern Cross Rally, officially the Total Oil Southern Cross International Rally was the tenth running of the Southern Cross Rally. The rally took place between the 8th and the 12th of October 1975. The event covered 3,367 kilometres from Sydney to Port Macquarie. It was won by Andrew Cowan and Fred Gocentas, driving a Mitsubishi Lancer GSR.

== Results ==
Pos	No	Entrant	Drivers	Car	Penalties (Points)
1	4	Mitsubishi (Australia) Pty Ltd	(United Kingdom) Andrew Cowan (Australia) Fred Gocentas	Mitsubishi Lancer GSR	189
2	6	Mitsubishi (Australia) Pty Ltd	(Australia) Barry Ferguson (Australia) Lindsay Adcock	Mitsubishi Lancer GSR	201
3	3	(Australia) Gerry Ball Tuning Service	(Australia) Greg Carr (Australia) Wayne Gregson	Datsun 180B SSS	215
4	8	Mitsubishi (Australia) Pty Ltd	(Australia) Doug Stewart (Australia) John Dawson-Damer	Mitsubishi Lancer GSR	277
5	20	(Australia) De Bortoli's Wines P/L	(Australia) Bruce Hodgson (Australia) Chris Heaney	Ford Escort RS 1600 Mark I	368
6	30	(Australia) Subaru Pty Ltd	(Australia) James Laing-Peach (Australia) Barry Lake	Subaru Leone A22	373
7	21	(Japan) Takashi Hirabayashi	(Japan) Takashi Hirabayashi (Japan) Yoshimasa Nakahara	Subaru Leone A22	397
8	32	(Australia) Bruce Cheesman	(Australia) Bruce Chessman (Australia) Alan Horsley	Mitsubishi Lancer	405
9	23	(Japan) Shigeru Kanno	(Japan) Shigeru Kanno (Japan) Kiyoshi Kawamura	Mitsubishi Lancer	442
10	35	(Japan) Noriyuki Koseki	(Japan) Noriyuki Koseki (Japan) Takao Ishii	Subaru Leone A22	440
11	48	(Australia) Gary Mecak	(Australia) Gary Mecak (Australia) John Trumpmanis	Mazda RX-3	461
12	49	(Japan) Susumu Enjitsu	(Japan) Susumu Enjitsu (Japan) Osamu Nishimura	Mitsubishi Lancer	501
