= 1980 Southern Cross Rally =

1980 Southern Cross Rally Southern Cross International Rally
- Host country: Australia
- Rally base: Sydney; Port Macquarie
- Dates run: 18 – 22 October 1980
- Stages: 35 (1,098.54 km; 682.60 miles)
- Stage surface: Tarmac and Gravel
- Overall distance: 2,616.19 km (1,625.63 miles)

Statistics
- Crews: 45 at start, 24 at finish

Overall results
- Overall winner: Ross Dunkerton; Jeff Beaumont; Nissan Motor Australia

The 1980 Southern Cross Rally, officially the Southern Cross International Rally was the fifteenth and final running of the Southern Cross Rally. The rally took place between the 18th and the 22nd of October 1980. The event covered 2,616 kilometres from Sydney to Port Macquarie. It was won by Ross Dunkerton and Jeff Beaumont, driving a Datsun Stanza.

== Results ==
Pos	No	Entrant	Drivers	Car	Overall Time
1	4	Nissan Motor Australia	(Australia) Ross Dunkerton (Australia) Jeff Beaumont	Datsun Stanza	13hr 56min 26sec
2	3	Ford Motor Company of Australia	(Australia) Greg Carr (Australia) Fred Gocentas	Ford Escort RS 1800 Mark II	13hr 59min 26sec
3	1	Ford Motor Company of Australia	(Finland) Ari Vatanen (United Kingdom) David Richards	Ford Escort RS 1800 Mark II	14hr 23min 29sec
4	9	(Australia) Gosford Dyno Tune Centre	(Australia) Ian Hill (Australia) Ann Heaney	Ford Escort RS 1800 Mark II	14hr 58min 52sec
5	12	(Australia) Kambrook Distributing P/L	(Australia) David Jones (Australia) Ian Pearson	Holden Commodore VB	15hr 33min 22sec
6	11	(Australia) Frank Johnston	(Australia) Frank Johnston (Australia) Stephen Vanderbyl	Mazda 323 Rotary	15hr 36min 33sec
7	27	(Australia) G.J Berne	(Australia) John Berne (Australia) David Peiti	Ford Escort RS 2000 Mark II	15hr 50min 7sec
8	13	(Australia) Race & Rally Sales P/L	(Australia) Gordon Leven (Australia) Robert Wilson	Datsun 1600 SSS	16hr 4min 34sec
9	26	(Australia) Bathurst Light Car Club	(Australia) Graham Clark (Australia) Arthur Davis	Datsun 180B	16hr 14min 43sec
10	20	(Australia) Apex Batteries P/L	(Australia) Gary Meehan (Australia) Greg Gifford	Toyota Celica RA40	16hr 17min 36sec
11	22	(Australia) Mazcars Croydon	(Australia) Gary Mecak (Australia) Ron Marks	Mazda 323	16hr 24min 27sec
12	21	(Australia) Max Roberts	(Australia) Max Roberts (Australia) Tony Carroll	Datsun Stanza	16hr 37min 30sec
13	10	(Japan) IMSC Monster	(Japan) Nobuhiro Tajima (Japan) Kiyoshi Kawamura	Datsun Stanza	16hr 44min 24sec
14	38	(Australia) Wayne Pritchard	(Australia) Wayne Pritchard (Australia) Garry Pritchard	Ford Escort RS2000 Mark II	16hr 52min 1sec
15	33	(Australia) Alan McLucas	(Australia) Alan McLucas (United Kingdom) Derek Hunter	Datsun 180B SSS	17hr 5min 35sec
16	16	Citizen Watches Australia	(Australia) Peter Nelson (Australia) Grahame Moule	Datsun 1600	17hr 14min 16sec
17	36	(Australia) Col Parry	(Australia) Col Parry (Australia) Philip Speer	Holden Commodore VB	17hr 18min 26sec
18	24	(Australia) Stones Corner Motors	(Australia) Hank Kabel (Australia) Gary Kabel	Mazda 323	17hr 31min 7sec
19	15	(Australia) Whalebone Wharf	(Australia) Dan White (Australia) Steve Griffiths	Ford Escort RS2000 Mark II	17hr 51min 29sec
20	32	(Australia) John Murray	(Australia) John Murray (Australia) Jeff D'Albora	Holden Commodore VB	17hr 52min 4sec
21	41	(Australia) Stephen Annabel	(Australia) Stephen Annabel (Australia) Fran Fifield	Mazda RX-3	17hr 56min 45sec
22	25	(Australia) Christian Autosports Club	(Australia) George Kahler (Australia) Greg Weale	Mazda RX-7	18hr 54min 25sec
23	30	(Japan) N.D.C. Tokyo	(Japan) Takashi Yufune (Japan) Yukiaki Aida	Datsun Sunny	19hr 37min 56sec
24	31	(Australia) George Rugg	(Australia) George Rugg (Australia) -	Mitsubishi Galant	20hr 7min 45sec
