= Southern Cross Rally =

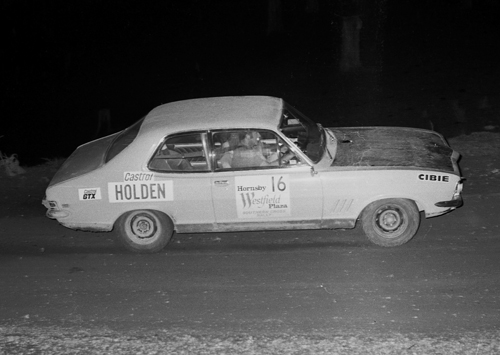
Two time winners Barry Ferguson and Dave Johnson in the Holden Dealer Team Torana GTR XU-1 on their way to their win in the 1970 Southern Cross Rally.

The Southern Cross Rally was a major international rally mainly held in the Port Macquarie region of New South Wales, Australia, between 1966 and 1980. The rally attracted many of the world's leading rally drivers and factory teams.

The inaugural Southern Cross Rally was won by Harry Firth in a works Ford Cortina. Scotsman Andrew Cowan dominated the event in the 1970s winning the rally five years in a row for the Mitsubishi works team from 1972 to 1976. The last four wins were in a Mitsubishi Lancer 1600 GSR and Cowan had also earlier won the 1969 'Cross in an Austin 1800 making a total of six victories.

Some other notable Southern Cross winners were Colin Bond in a Holden Dealer Team Torana GTR XU-1 in 1971, the 'flying Finn' Rauno Aaltonen in a Datsun Violet 710 in 1977, Talmalmo farmer George Fury in 1978 and 1979 in the Datsun Stanza and Ross Dunkerton who won the 1980 rally driving a Stanza.

There were many famous international rally drivers who contested the rally without winning it, including world champions Swedes Björn Waldegård and Stig Blomqvist, and Finns Ari Vatanen and Hannu Mikkola. Some other notable international rally drivers who competed include Edgar Herrmann, Timo Mäkinen, Shekhar Mehta and Paddy Hopkirk.

The final Southern Cross Rally in 1980 was a hard-fought battle between the Datsun Stanzas of Dunkerton, Fury and Geoff Portman and the Ford Escort BDA's driven by Greg Carr and Ari Vatanen. Dunkerton held off the Escorts to win. A combination of lack of sponsorship money and 'burn-out' of the rally organisers led to the demise of what was still a very competitive event.

== Winners ==
Year	Driver	Navigator	Vehicle
1966	Harry Firth	Graham Hoinville	Ford Cortina GT
1967	Barry Ferguson	Dave Johnson	Volkswagen Beetle
1968	John Keran	Peter Meyer	Volvo 142S
1969	Andrew Cowan	Dave Johnson	Austin 1800
1970	Barry Ferguson	Dave Johnson	Holden Torana GTR XU-1
1971	Colin Bond	George Shepheard	Holden Torana GTR XU-1
1972	Andrew Cowan	John Bryson	Mitsubishi Galant
1973	Andrew Cowan	John Bryson	Mitsubishi Lancer 1600 GSR
1974	Andrew Cowan	John Bryson	Mitsubishi Lancer 1600 GSR
1975	Andrew Cowan	Fred Gocentas	Mitsubishi Lancer 1600 GSR
1976	Andrew Cowan	Fred Gocentas	Mitsubishi Lancer 1600 GSR
1977	Rauno Aaltonen	Jeff Beaumont	Datsun 710
1978	George Fury	Monty Suffern	Datsun Stanza
1979	George Fury	Monty Suffern	Datsun Stanza
1980	Ross Dunkerton	Jeff Beaumont	Datsun Stanza
