= 1977 Southern Cross Rally =

1977 Southern Cross Rally Total Oil Southern Cross International Rally
Round 16 of the 1977 FIA Cup for Rally Drivers
← Previous event	Next event →
- Host country: Australia
- Rally base: Sydney; Port Macquarie
- Dates run: 8 – 13 October 1977
- Stages: 35 (1,495.32 km; 929.15 miles)
- Stage surface: Tarmac and Gravel
- Overall distance: 2,683.93 km (1,667.72 miles)

Statistics
- Crews: 68 at start, 20 at finish

Overall results
- Overall winner: (Finland) Rauno Aaltonen; Jeff Beaumont; Nissan Motor Australia

The 1977 Southern Cross Rally, officially the Total Oil Southern Cross International Rally was the twelfth running of the Southern Cross Rally and the sixteenth round of the 1977 FIA Cup for Rally Drivers. The rally took place between the 8th and the 13th of October 1977. The event covered 2,683 kilometres from Sydney to Port Macquarie. It was won by Rauno Aaltonen and Jeff Beaumont, driving a Datsun 710 SSS.

== Results ==
Pos	No	Entrant	Drivers	Car	Penalties (Time)
1	3	Nissan Motor Australia	(Finland) Rauno Aaltonen (Australia) Jeff Beaumont	Datsun 710 SSS	1hr 20min 24sec
2	4	Nissan Motor Australia	(Sweden) Harry Källström (Sweden) Claes Billstam	Datsun 710 SSS	1hr 25min 25sec
3	12	(Australia) Gerry Ball Tuning Service	(Australia) Bob Watson (Australia) Peter Godden	Datsun 710 SSS	1hr 54min 21sec
4	9	(Japan) Colt Motor Sports Club	(Japan) Kenjiro Shinozuka (Australia) Garry Connelly	Mitsubishi Lancer GSR	1hr 55min 51sec
5	8	Ford Motor Company of Australia	(Australia) Greg Carr (Australia) Wayne Gregson	Ford Escort RS 1800 Mark II	2hr 32min 31sec
6	5	Nissan Motor Australia	(Kenya) Shekhar Mehta (Australia) Adrian Mortimer	Datsun PB210	2hr 39min 45sec
7	23	(Australia) Gosford Dyno-Tune Centre	(Australia) Ian Hill (Australia) Graham Roser	Mitsubishi Lancer GSR	3hr 14min 21sec
8	27	(Australia) Gosford Dyno-Tune Centre	(Australia) Ross Jackson (Australia) Peter Berriman	Mitsubishi Lancer GSR	3hr 34min 30sec
9	28	(Australia) Rallyequip	(Japan) Singeru Kanno (Japan) Kiyoshi Kawamura	Mitsubishi Lancer GSR	3hr 53min 26sec
10	13	(New Zealand) Masport NZ Limited	(New Zealand) Blair Robson (New Zealand) Chris Porter	Ford Escort RS 1800 Mark II	4hr 28min 11sec
11	14	(Japan) H. Yoshimoto	(Japan) Hisao Kunimasa (Japan) Mikihiko Kawai	Subaru Leone	4hr 53min 24sec
12	33	(Australia) Brian Hilton	(Australia) Brian Hilton (Australia) Barry Lake	Peugeot 504 TI	5hr 18min 51sec
13	76	(Australia) Stephen Taylor	(Australia) Stephen Taylor (Australia) Gregory Pepper	Mitsubishi Galant	5hr 26min 14sec
14	54	(Australia) Cascade Motors	(Australia) Gordon Leven (Australia) Phil Bonsar	Datsun 180B SSS	5hr 52min 37sec
15	60	(Japan) Hideya Satoh	(Japan) Hideya Satoh (Australia) Barry Jarman	Isuzu Gemini PF50	6hr 11min 10sec
16	64	(Australia) New England Sporting Car Club	(Australia) Graeme Taylor (Australia) Kevin Pearson	Ford Escort 1600 Mark II	6hr 16min 24sec
17	49	(Australia) Rallyequip	(Japan) Kenji Sato (Japan) Yasunobu Ninomiya	Toyota Corolla Coupe TE30	6hr 46min 33sec
18	65	(Japan) Eiji Bessho	(Japan) Eiji Bessho (Japan) Shiro Kawabe	Isuzu Gemini PF50	6hr 50min 8sec
19	77	(Australia) I.R. Fowler	(Australia) Rex Fowler (Australia) Patrick Roberts	Datsun 1600	7hr 9min 49sec
20	53	(Australia) Subaru Queensland Dealer Group	(Australia) Tony Jewels (Australia) David Kortland	Subaru Leone	7hr 14min 18sec
