= 5I =

5I or 5-I can refer to:

- IATA code for Air G, also called Transair Georgia
- Amos-5i, an AsiaSat 2 satellite
- SSH 5I (WA), see Washington State Route 510

== See also ==
- I5 (disambiguation)
- C5I, a military acronym
- Five Eyes, an intelligence alliance
