= Honda Civic (first generation) =

Honda Civic First generation (SB1/SG/SH/SE/VB)
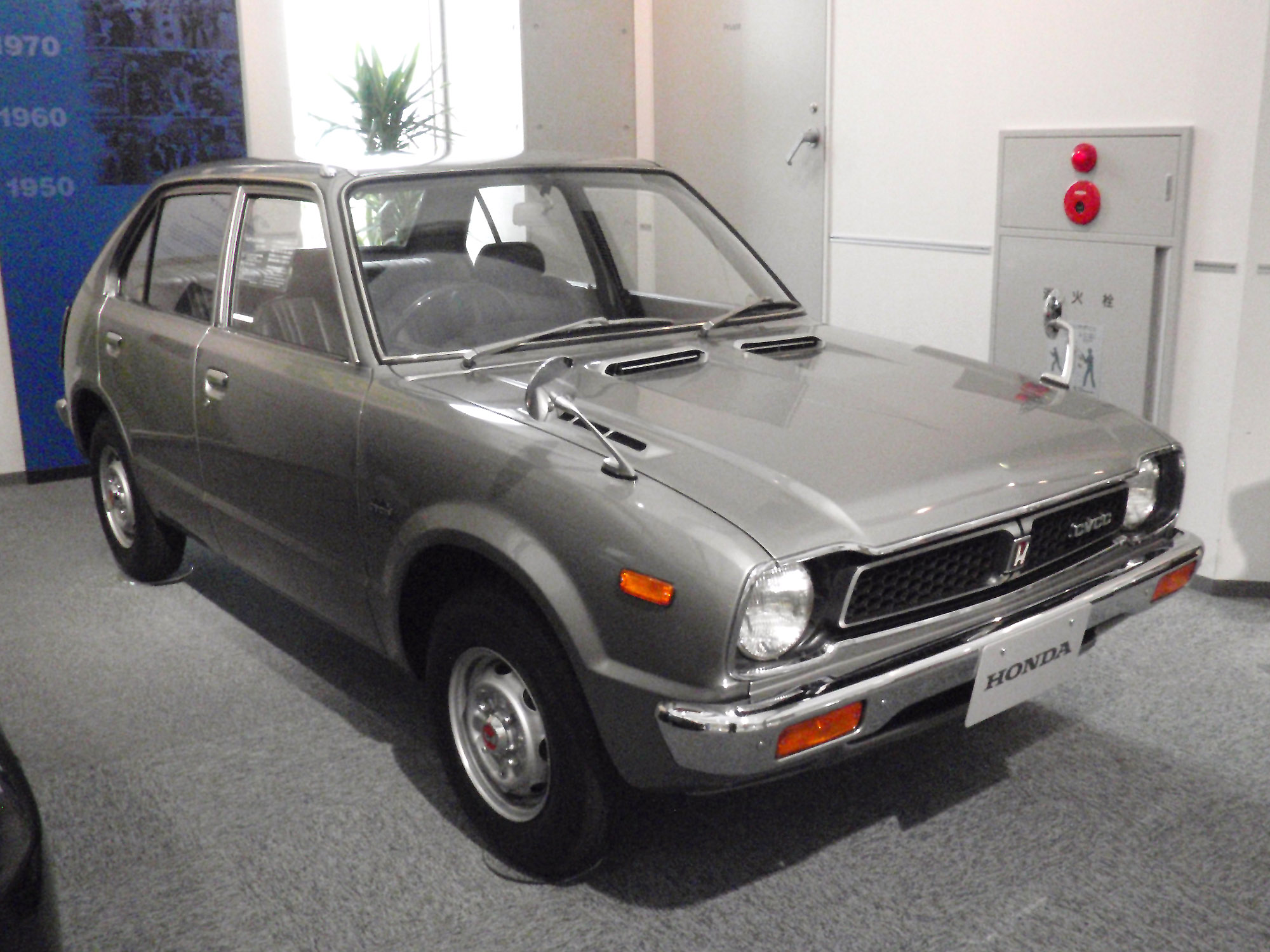
- 1972–1975 Honda Civic CVCC 4-door sedan (base-mid trim Japanese model)

Overview
- Manufacturer: Honda
- Production: July 1972–June 1979
- Assembly: Suzuka, Mie, Japan; Petone, New Zealand; North Jakarta, Indonesia (from 1975); Johor Bahru, Malaysia
- Designer: Hiroshi Kizawa, Shinya Iwakura

Body and chassis
- Body style: 2/4-door fastback sedan (SB1/SE/SG); 3/5-door hatchback (SB1/SG); 5-door station wagon
- Layout: Front-engine, front-wheel-drive

Powertrain
- Engine: 1169 cc EB1 I4; 1237 cc EB2 I4; 1237 cc EE CVCC I4; 1335 cc EJ CVCC I4; 1488 cc EC I4; 1488 cc ED CVCC I4
- Transmission: 4-speed manual; 5-speed manual; 2-speed Hondamatic semi-automatic

Dimensions
- Wheelbase: 2,200 mm (86.6 in); 2,280 mm (89.8 in) (wagon)
- Length: 3,405–3,560 mm (134.1–140.2 in); 3,754 mm (147.8 in) (North America); 4,065 mm (160.0 in) (wagon)
- Width: 1,505 mm (59.3 in)
- Height: 1,325–1,330 mm (52.2–52.4 in) (hatchback/sedan); 1,360 mm (53.5 in) (wagon)
- Curb weight: 600–790 kg (1,323–1,742 lb) (hatchback/sedan); 810 kg (1,786 lb) (wagon)

Chronology
- Predecessor: Honda N600; Honda Z600
- Successor: Honda Civic (second generation)

The first-generation Honda Civic is an automobile that was produced by Honda in Japan from July 1972 until 1979. It was their first genuine market success, eschewing the air-cooling and expensive engineering solutions of the slow-selling Honda 1300 and being larger than the minuscule N-series. The Civic laid down the direction Honda's automobile design has followed since.

== Model year changes ==
The Civic was largely developed on a new platform and was the result of increasing the previous Honda N600's length, width, height, and wheelbase. The engine displacement was almost double that of the N600, from 599 cc (36.6 cu in) to 1,169 cc (71.3 cu in), with two more cylinders and mounted transversely, using water cooling and benefiting from lessons learned from the Honda 1300. The straight-four engine produced about 50 hp (37 kW), and standard features included power front disc brakes, vinyl seating, reclining bucket seats, and a woodgrain-accented dashboard. The hatchback version added a fold-down rear seat, an AM radio, and cloth upholstery. The car had independent front and rear suspension. A four-speed manual transmission was standard. Options were kept to a minimum, consisting of air conditioning, a two-speed semi-automatic transmission called the Hondamatic, radial tires, and a rear wiper for the hatchback. The car could achieve 40 mpg_{‑US} (5.9 L/100 km; 48 mpg_{‑imp}) on the highway, and with a short 86.6-inch (2,200 mm) wheelbase and 139.8-inch (3,551 mm) overall length, the vehicle weighed 1,500 lb (680 kg).

The Civic was one of the first Honda cars to be sold in Britain when it was launched there in 1972, at a time when sales of Japanese cars from Honda's competitors, Nissan and Toyota, were soaring. The 1972 Civic marked the debut of Honda’s iconic Civic line, which quickly gained recognition as a compact, economical, and reliable car. Designed to compete in a growing market for small, fuel-efficient vehicles, the Civic featured a transversely mounted engine and front-wheel drive, maximizing interior space while maintaining a small exterior footprint. transverse-mounted engine and front-wheel drive, which maximized interior space while maintaining a small exterior footprint. Its compact design and economical engine made it attractive in Britain in the aftermath of the 1973 oil crisis.

The four-door sedan version of this body style (similar to the hatchback but with a fixed rear window and an opening lower trunk lid) was not available in the United States. The five-door hatchback was introduced in 1978, just before the second generation model. The five-door had been presented in Japan in September 1977, and the four-door sedan was discontinued in June 1978.

The Civic's smaller size allowed it to outperform American subcompacts that included the AMC Gremlin, Chevrolet Vega, and Ford Pinto. When the 1973 oil crisis struck, automobile buyers turned to economy cars. Good fuel mileage benefited the standing of the Honda Civic in the U.S. market. In the United States after 1976, the advertising campaign used to introduce the Civic was, "Honda, we make it simple" replacing "What the world is coming to." The tagline continued until the 1984 model year, when the company revamped its product lineup.

For 1974, the Civic's engine size grew slightly, to 1237 cc, and power increased to 52 hp (39 kW). To meet the new North American 5-mile-per-hour (8 km/h) bumper impact standard, the Civic's bumpers grew 7.1 in (180 mm), increasing overall length to 146.9 in (3,731 mm). The CVCC (Compound Vortex Controlled Combustion) engine debuted in 1975. It was offered alongside the standard Civic engine. The optional 53 hp (40 kW) CVCC engine displaced 1488 cc and had a head design that promoted cleaner, more efficient combustion. The CVCC design eliminated the need for catalytic converters or unleaded fuel to meet changing emissions standards. Due to California's stricter emissions standards, only the CVCC-powered Civic was available in that state. The CVCC-equipped emissions equipment was not damaged by using leaded fuel.

A five-speed manual transmission became available in 1974, as did a Civic station wagon (only with the 1500 CVCC engine), which had a wheelbase of 89.9 in (2,283 mm) and an overall length of 160 in (4,064 mm). Power for this version is 75 PS (55 kW) in the Japanese domestic market. Civic sales also increased and topped 100,000 units for this year.

The 1978 model year brought slight cosmetic changes: the grille was black; the rear-facing hood vents replaced the sideways vents; the tail lamps were changed from 1/3 amber signals to 1/2 amber signals of grooved lens; the reverse light was doubled and mounted in the rear bumper, integrated with reflectors; and turn indicators integrated with position lamps were mounted in the front bumper instead of in the grille. The CVCC engine was now rated at 60 PS (44 kW).

== Sporting variants ==
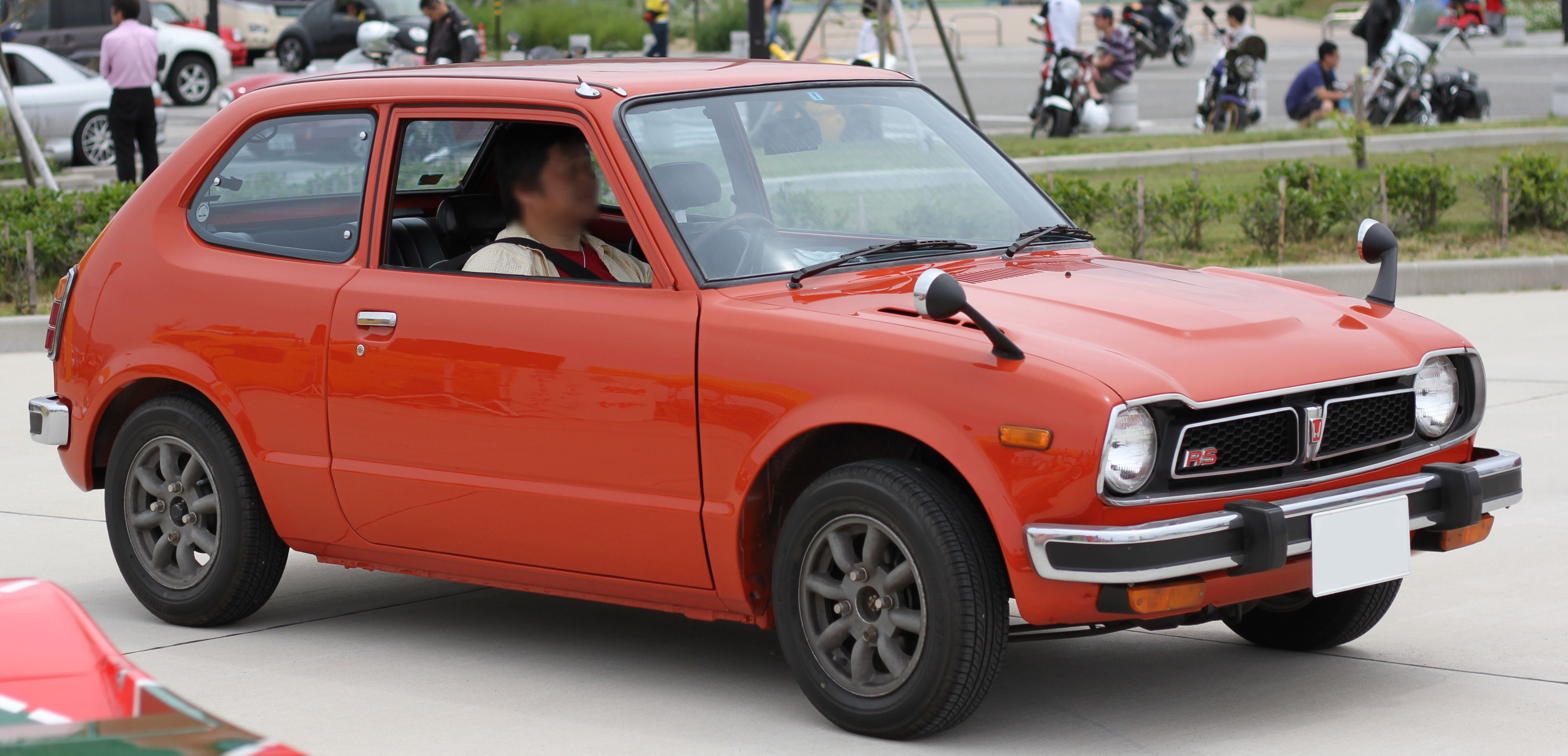

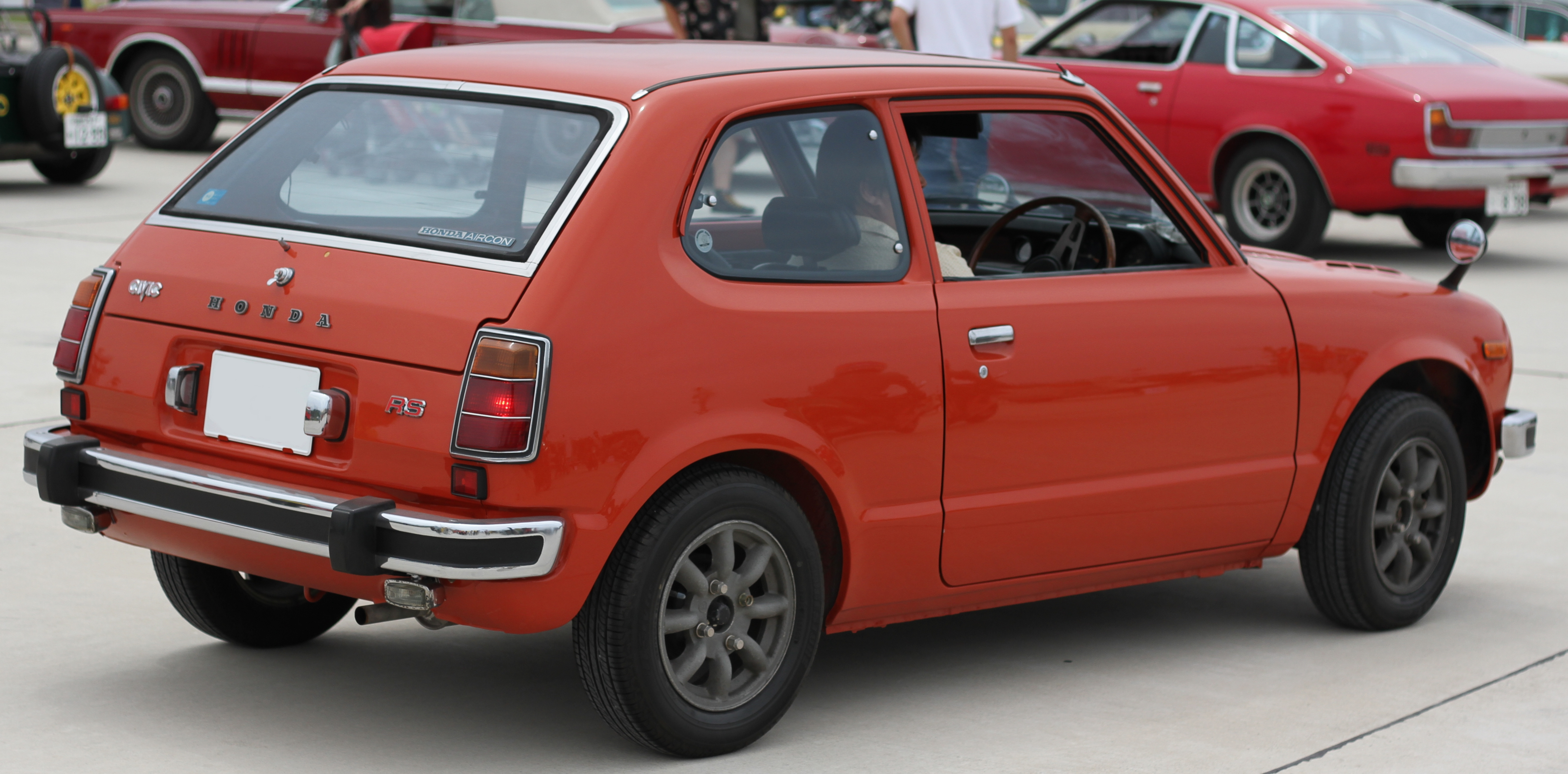
Civic RS

In October 1974, Civic's first sport model was added to the lineup. The Civic 1200 RS was only sold in the domestic Japanese market; its name is an abbreviation of "Road Sailing." It is powered by a 1169 cc SOHC 8-valve EB engine fitted with dual Keihin CV carburettors, a free-flowing intake manifold, more aggressive cam, high-compression pistons and a unique exhaust header. These modifications bumped up the power to 76 PS (56 kW) at 5500 rpm and 101 N⋅m (74 lb⋅ft) of torque at 4000 rpm. The transmission was also replaced with a 5-speed manual transmission and the suspension received stiffer springs and dampers for better handling. In total, about 20,000 Civic RS were built in a twelve-month production span.

In October 1975, to meet new stricter emission regulations, the 1200 RS was replaced by the low polluting 1500 RSL/GTL with a 1488 cc CVCC SOHC 12-valve ED engine. The power dropped marginally, to 75 PS (55 kW) at 5500 rpm, while the torque increased to 109 N⋅m (80 lb⋅ft) at 3500 rpm. These outputs were 2 PS and 3 Nm more than that of the regular 1.5 L models, thanks to an increased compression ratio and other modifications.

== Rust recalls ==
The first generation Honda Civics were notorious for rusting in less than three years from purchase where salt was used in the winter. The U.S. importer, American Honda Motor Company, signed a final consent decree with the Federal Trade Commission that provided owners of 1975–1979 Civics with rusted fenders the right to receive replacements or cash reimbursements. In the end, almost 1 million Honda owners were notified that their fenders could be repaired or replaced by the automaker at no charge. About 10% of all Hondas sold were to be inspected by a dealer, and the automaker had 180 days to replace front fenders and supporting parts that showed rust within the first three years of use.

The Hondas were so vulnerable to corrosion that the National Highway Traffic Safety Administration (NHTSA) also issued a safety recall. This was because the car's lateral suspension arms, front crossbeam, and strut coil spring lower supports could weaken with exposure to salt. A total of 936,774 vehicles built between 1 September 1972 and 1 August 1979 were subject to extensive repairs since Honda had to replace the suspension components, or the automaker bought back entire cars with serious body corrosion.

At the time, Honda's rust recall was the largest safety action among all the brands imported into the U.S. Civics became known for their "typical Honda rust" in the used car market.

== Overseas assembly ==
=== New Zealand ===
The first-generation Civic – a 1.2 L, three-door manual, was assembled in 1976 from CKD kits in New Zealand by importer and distributor New Zealand Motor Corporation (NZMC) at its Petone plant near Wellington. This was the first time Honda cars had been assembled outside Japan. The first-generation NZ Civic was also offered with optional two-speed semi-automatic 'Hondamatic' transmission. Earlier cars had, from 1973, been imported assembled by the Moller Group before NZMC took over the Honda franchise but availability was limited due to restrictions on built-up imports. All subsequent Civic generations were assembled in New Zealand until car manufacture there ceased in 1998.

=== Indonesia ===
The first-generation Honda Civic entered Indonesian market in 1972 and was imported from Japan through PT Imora Motor. It was only offered as 2-door sedan and 3-door hatchback, powered by 1.2 L engine and mated to a 4-speed manual transmission. In 1974, Indonesian government issued a ban on importing fully built-up vehicles. As the result, the first-generation Civic was assembled in Indonesia via imported CKD kits from 1975 until 1980 by PT Prospect Motor at their production plant in Sunter, Jakarta. The locally assembled version was only available as a 4-door sedan, powered by a bigger 1.5 L engine and mated to either 5-speed manual or 2-speed "Hondamatic" semi-automatic. This new powertrain combination was unusual in Indonesia at the time, where small cars were commonly offered with 1–1.3 L engines and 4-speed manual transmission as standard.

== Gallery ==
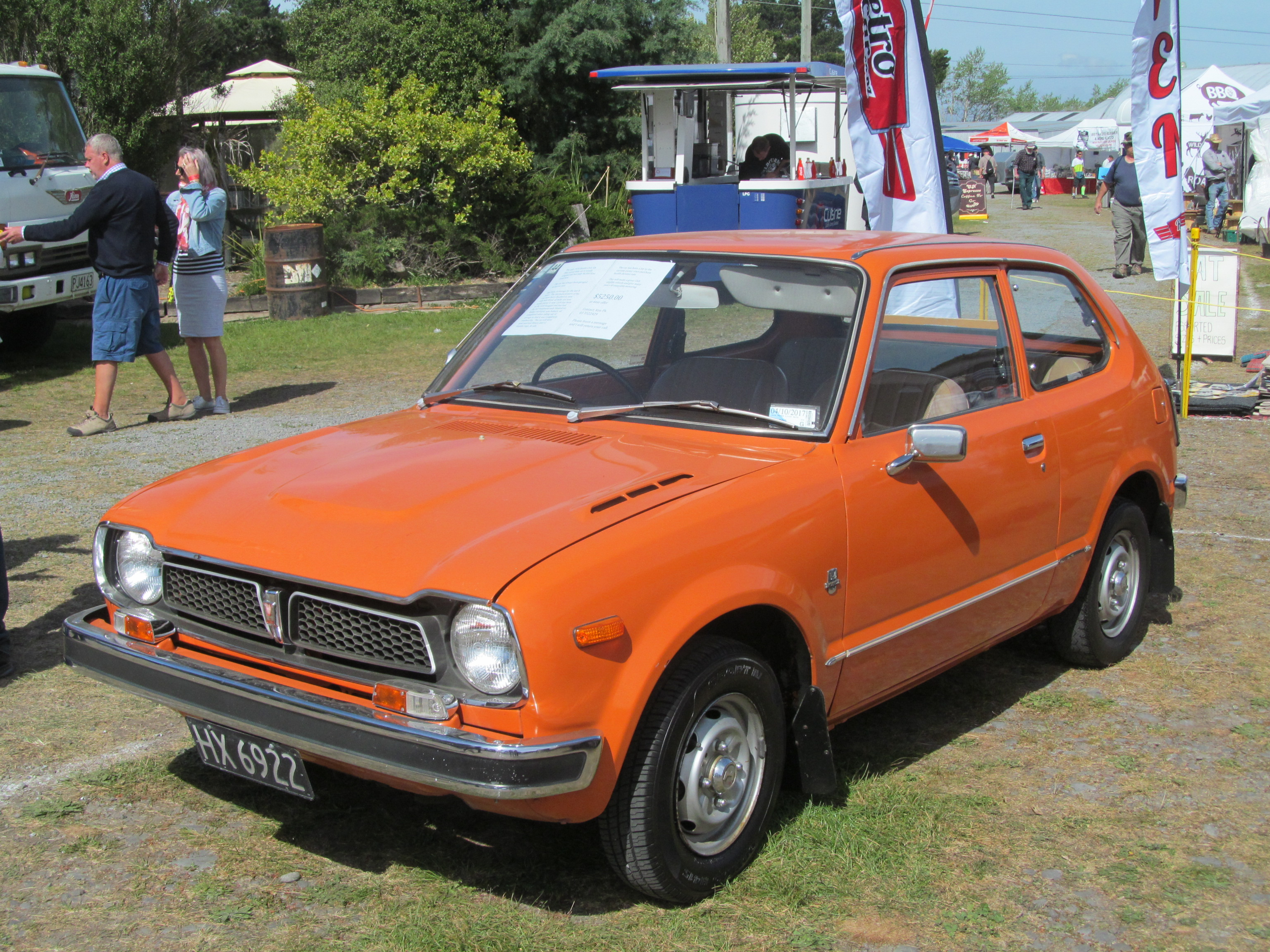
1972–1978 export model (except for North America)

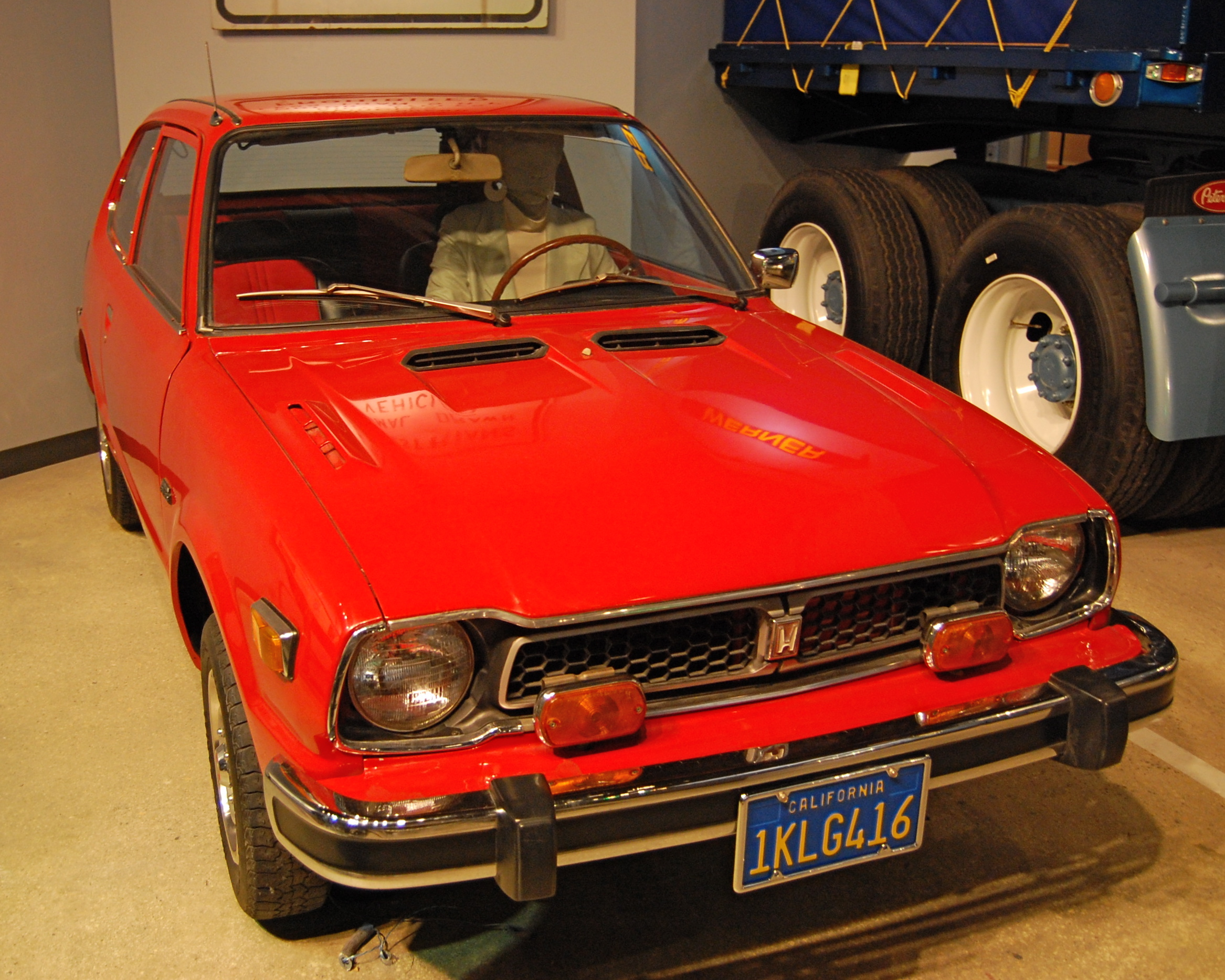
1973–1977 North American specification model

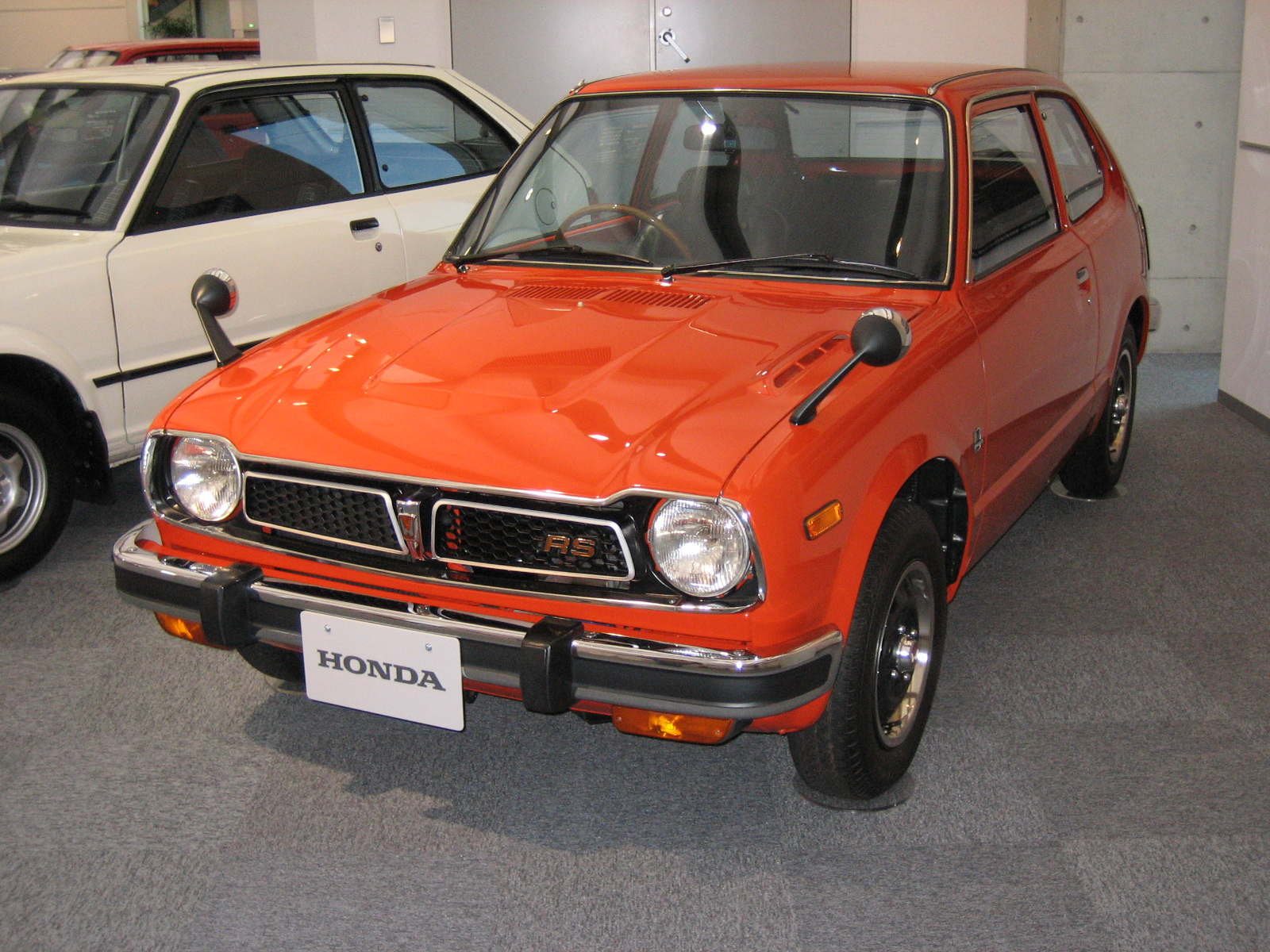
1974–1975 Japanese market Civic RS

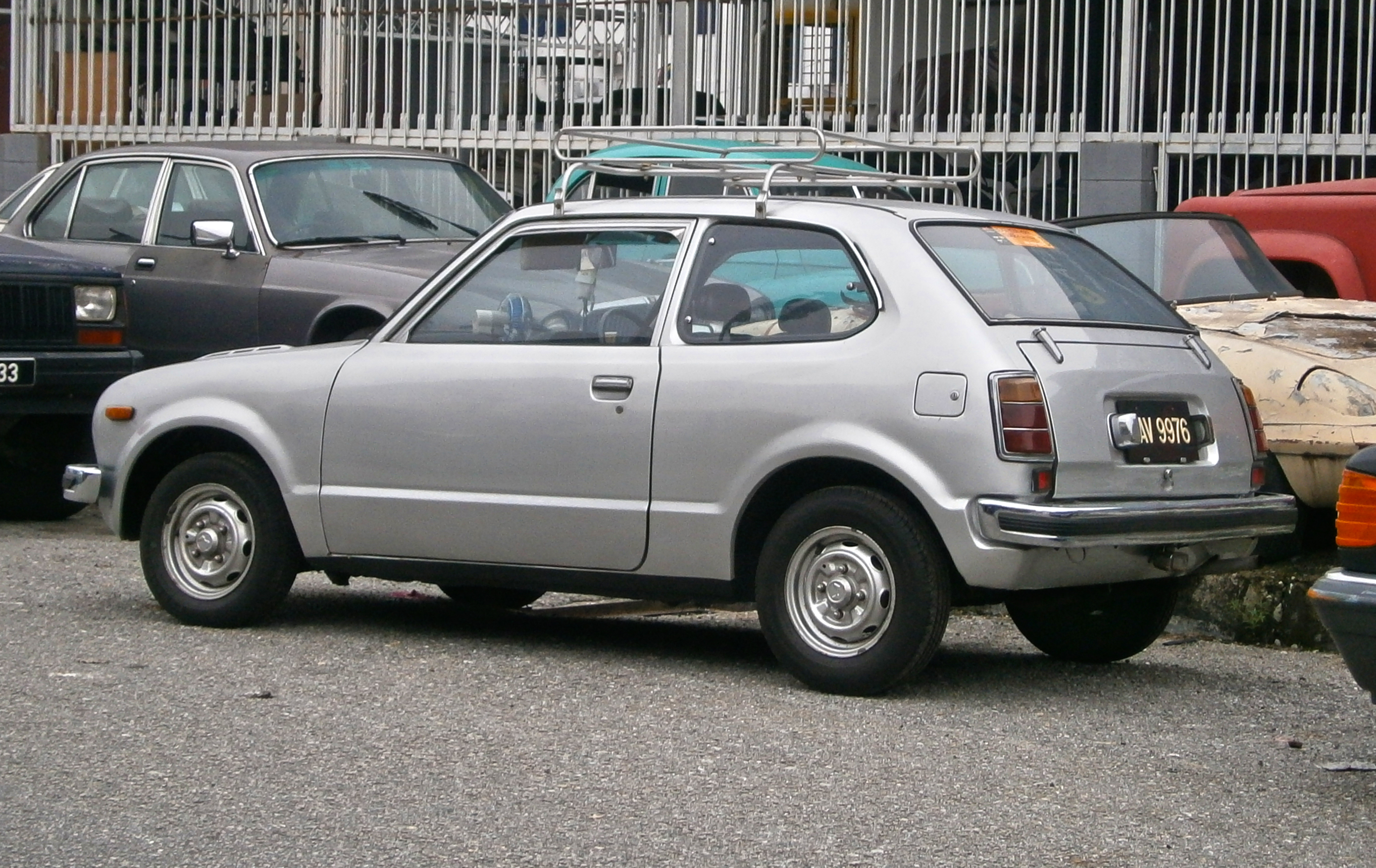
Civic 2-door sedan

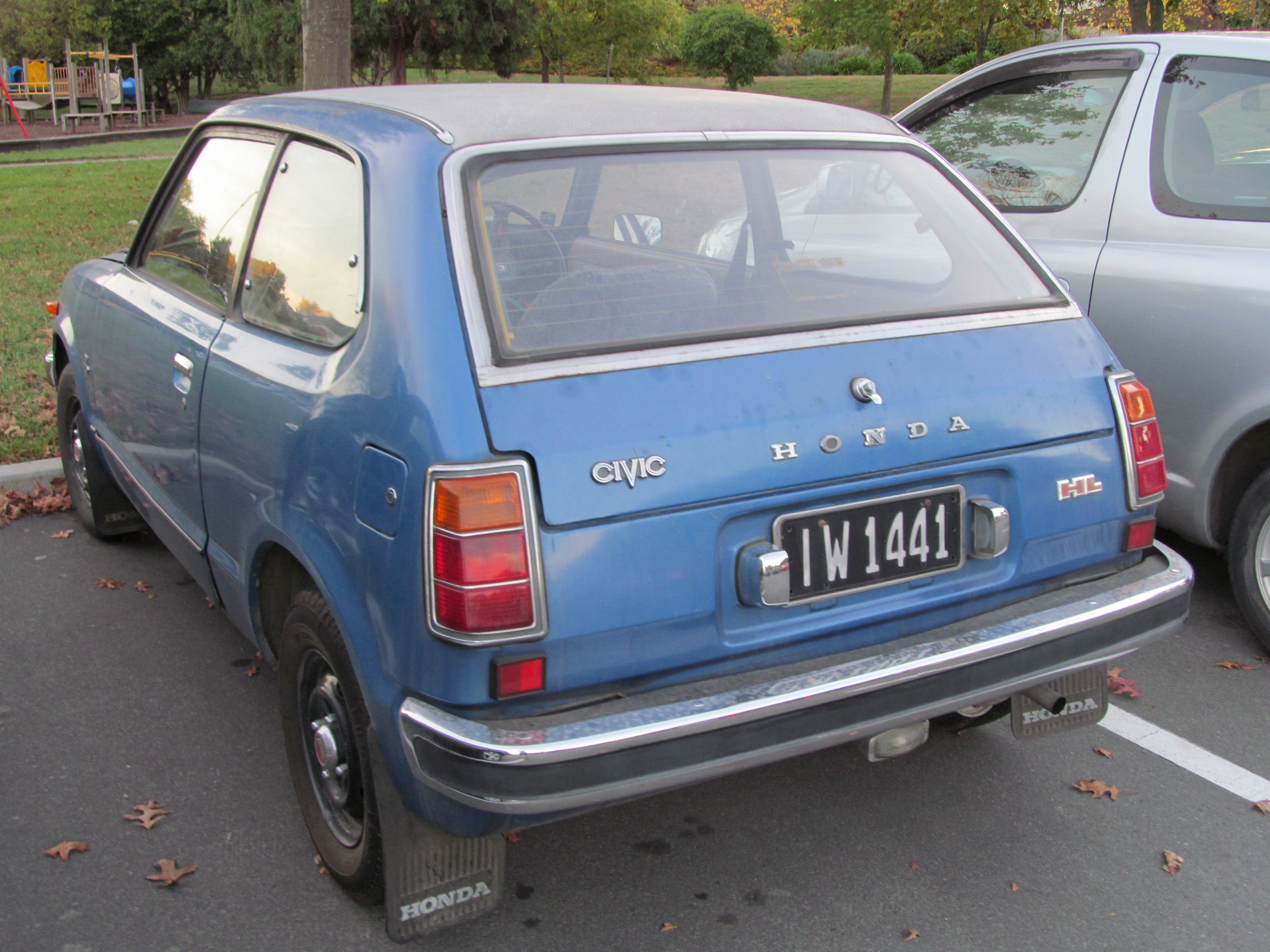
1972–1978 export 3-door model with rear hatch opening above the license plate

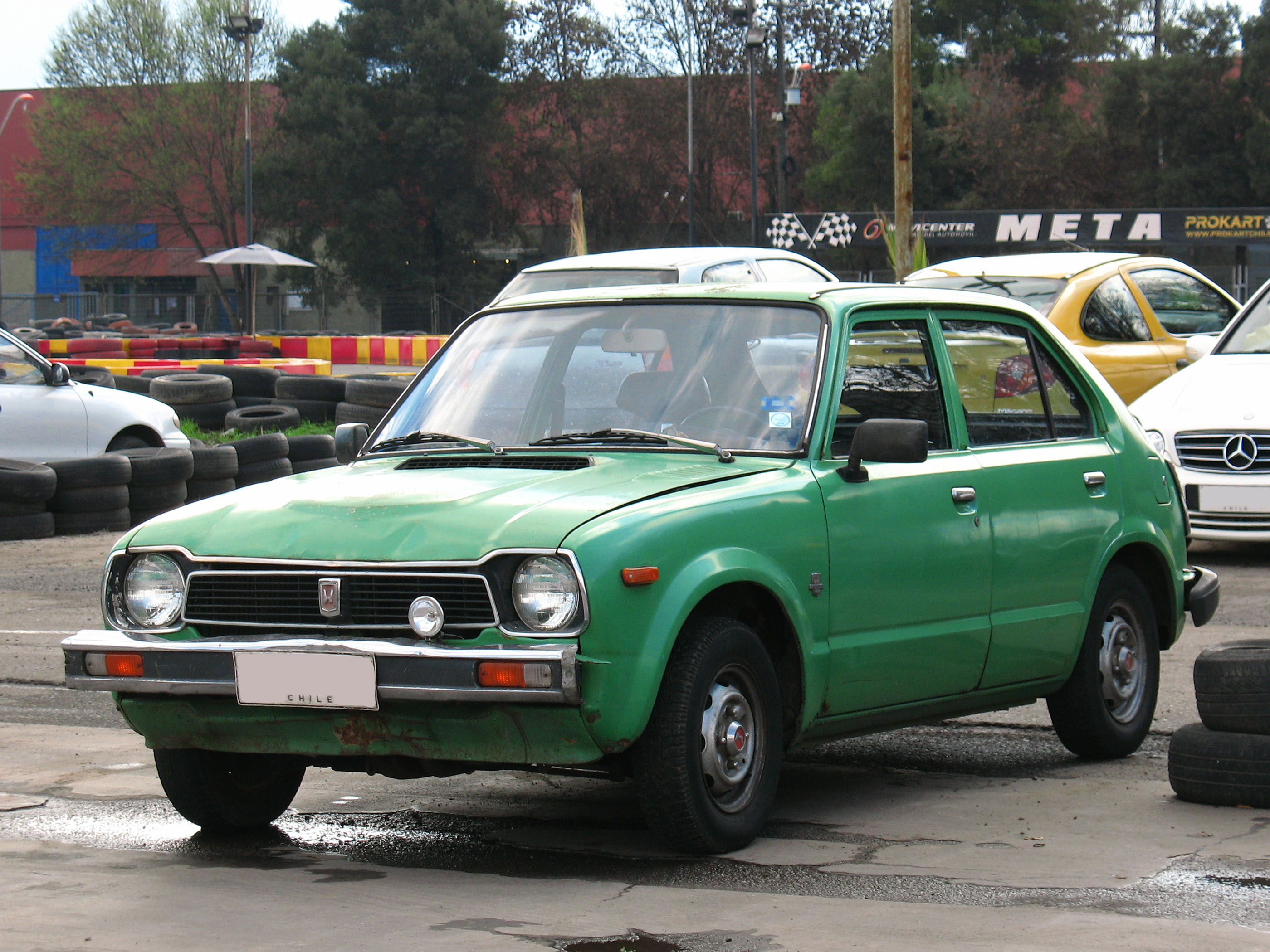
1978–1979 export model

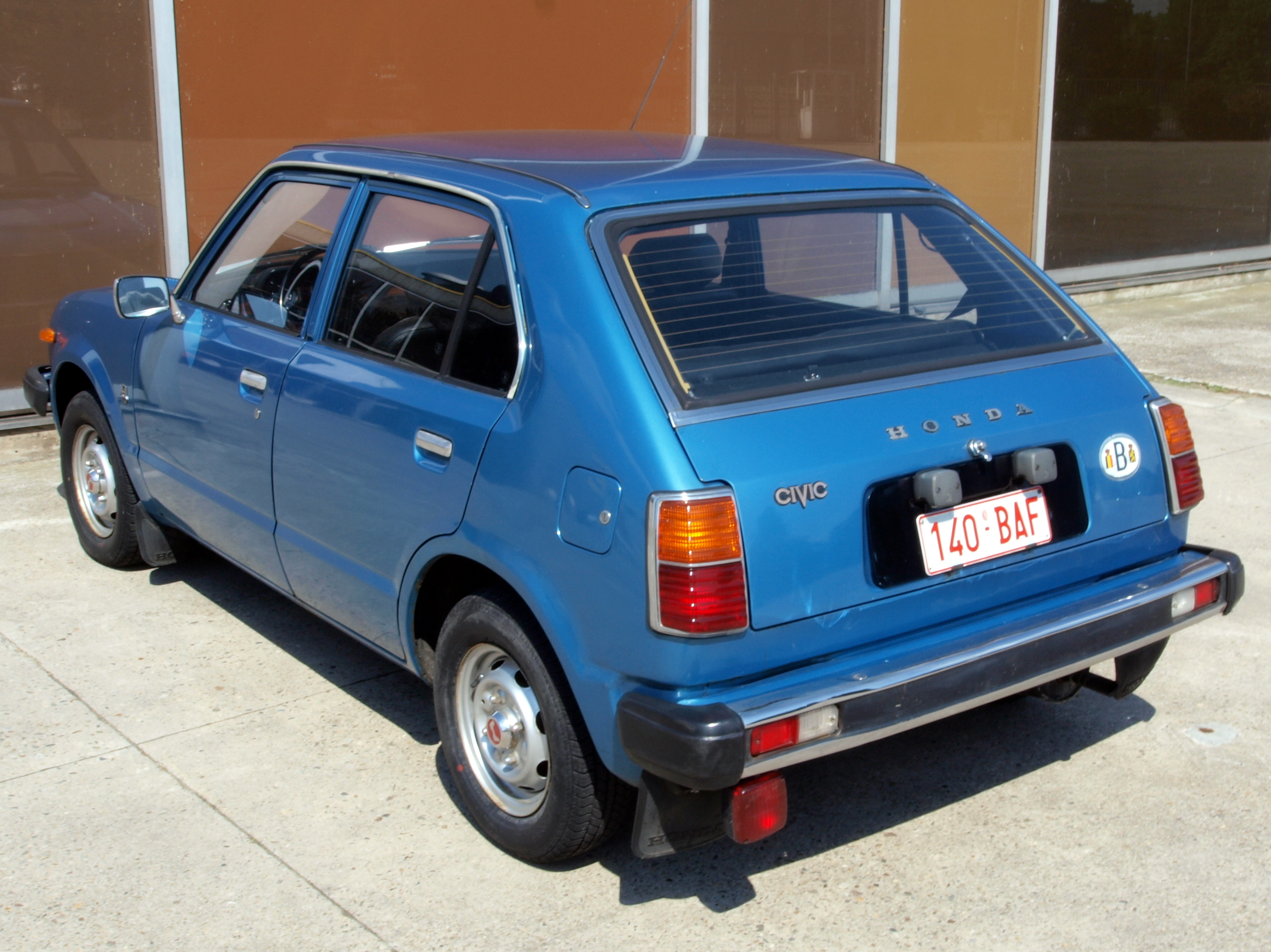
1978–1979 export 5-door model Civic with full rear hatch

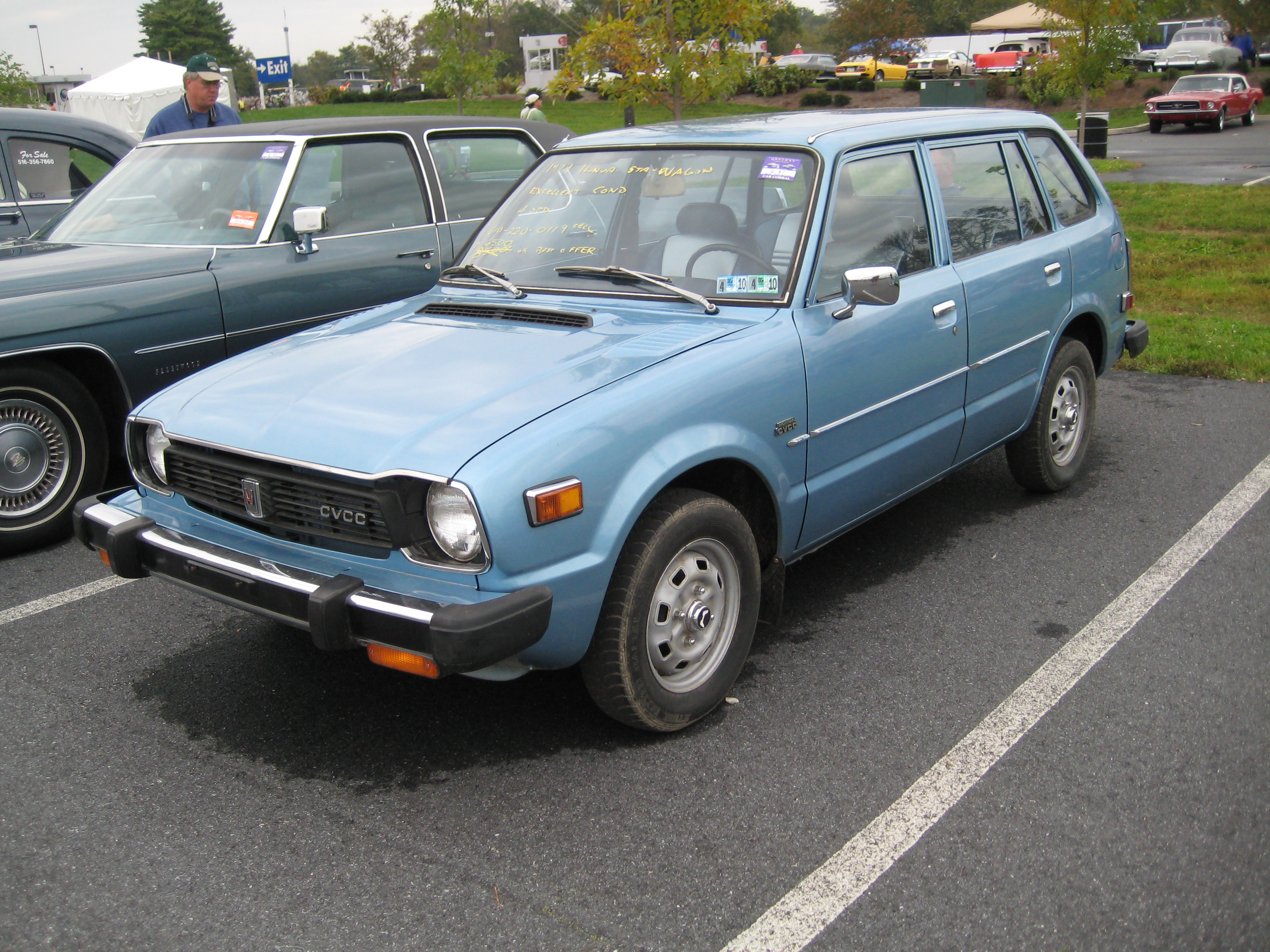
1977–1979 North American specification wagon

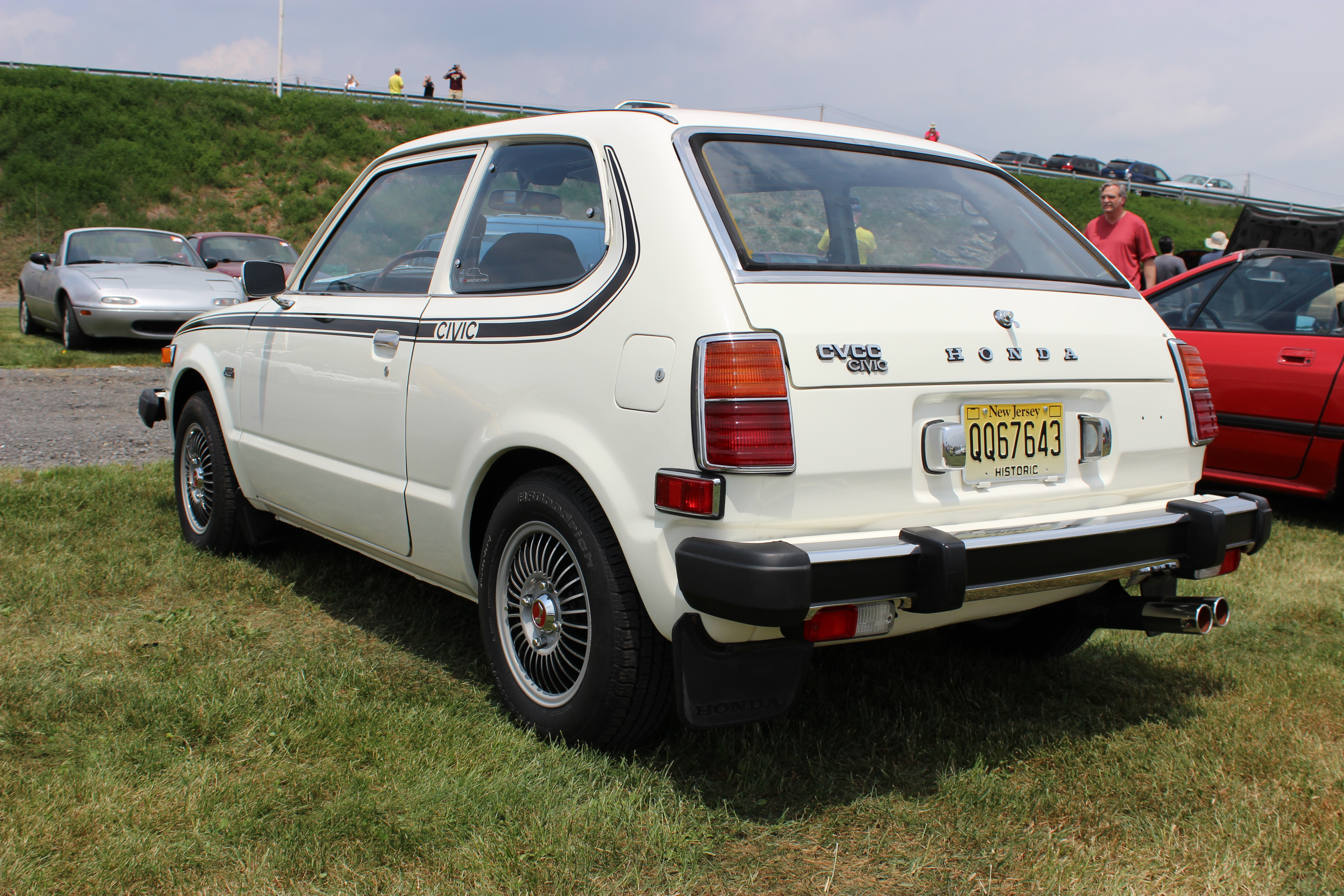
1977–1979 North American specification rear bumper

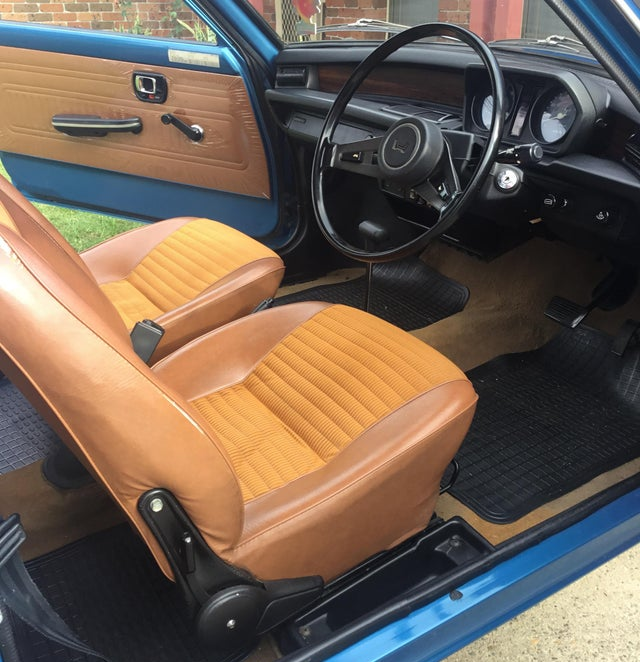
1979 Civic interior
