= Elec-Trak =

Electric tractor developed by General Electric

General Electric Elec-Trak tractor series

Overview
- Manufacturer: General Electric
- Production: 1969-1975
- Designer: Bruce R. Laumeister

Body and chassis
- Class: Agriculture

Powertrain
- Propulsion: Electric

External videos
- Elec-Trak – early demonstration video of the tractor, the attachments, and the different applications of use (full video)

The GE Elec-Trak was the first commercially produced all-electric garden tractor, made mostly between 1969 and 1975 at GE's Outdoor Power Equipment Operation under Bruce R. Laumeister. The previous work of Laumeister at GE on the experimental Delta electric car that debuted in 1968 helped pave the way for the production of the Elec-Trak. Despite the limited production and availability of the electric tractors, many Elec-Traks are still in use today and have a cult following among tractor and electric vehicle enthusiasts. They are an archetypal or seminal design that has influenced all later electric tractors.

== Models ==
Several models were produced, including: the E8M and ER8-36 (8 hp equivalent). The E10M (10 hp); the E12 and E12M (12 hp); the E12S and E15 (14 hp); the E16 (an upgraded variant of the E15), and the E20 (16 hp). GE's claimed horsepower figures were notional and inconsistent in documentation and sales literature; the table below includes "real" horsepower. The E8M and ER8-36 were styled more as ride-on mowers than tractors. The "M" suffix used on some models indicates the ability to accommodate a mid-mounted (belly) mower, and an "H" was used on some models to indicate a heavy duty, extra range battery pack.

Starting in 1972, GE also made an industrial version of the Elec-Trak, the I-5, compliant with all relevant sections of ANSI B56.1-1969 and OSHA FMEC Class E. Mostly identical to the E-20, it was orange instead of yellow, had a 12vdc warning horn, fenders over the front wheels, and attachment points for additional accessories, including a roll cage and forklifts of varying heights that could be mounted either forward or rear facing.

== Motors ==
Motor	Model/ID #	HP	Volts	Amps	RPM	If	Rf	Winding	Mounting	Shaft	Notes
E12 Drive	5BCE56KB5B	1.5	36	37	3500	2.25	16	Stabilized Shunt	foot	round keyed	
E15 Drive	5BCY56RA6	1	36	25	2250	1.9/.5		Stabilized Shunt	foot	round keyed	3" dia motor pulley, 6" dia trans pulley
E20 Drive	5BCY56TA2	1.2	36	30	2250	1.9/.5		Stabilized Shunt	foot	round, keyed	
METI Drive	ES-93A-33 D&D	3.5	36	85	2900	5		Shunt	foot	round, keyed	
GE "JB" Motors	5BC48JB529 / 302	2	36	52	3300			Series	foot	round, keyed	forklift appl
7.5" tall Mower Motor	5BPA34NAA7	0.6	36	15	4000	none		PM	flange	round, tapped axial hole	datecode EFN
6.5" tall Mower Motor	Bosch/Danaher BA3816-815-1	0.6	36	15	3200	none		PM	flange	round, tapped axial hole	
"flat" Mower Motor	American Bosch 18222-26-mo48hm	?	36	?	?	?		?	flange	round, tapped axial hole	WH belly mower
METI Mower	Scott Motors 4BBX1372	1.25	36	30	3750	none		PM	flange	round, tapped axial hole	
OEM Snowblower	5BC49JB131A / 142A	2.5	36	66	3100	4.8	22	Compound	foot	round, keyed	brush 1/2x5/8x1.75 #673
OEM Lift	5045631 Delco Window Motor	0.25	18		slow	none		Series	flange	Gearbox	
OEM Tiller	5BC49JB133B	2.5	36	66	3100	4.8		Compound	foot	round, keyed	

== Attachments ==
Elec-Trak branded attachments included electric trimmers, edgers, chainsaws, radios, arc welders, fork lifts, front-end loaders, rotary brooms, roller aerators, lawn rollers, dump carts, maintenance carts, large vacuums, agricultural sprayers, moldboard plows, row crop cultivators, tillers, disk harrows, sickle bar mowers, belly mowers, front-mounted rotary mowers, front or rear-mounted ganged reel mowers, lawn sweepers, electric rakes, snowplows, golf bag holders, double seats, 120VAC rotary inverters, canopy tops, and more.

The snowblower was commonly called snowthrower to draw distinction from the more mass marketable Leafblower certainly cheaper and more easily produced then anything ruggedized for below freezing that only sees use from the occasional snowfall. Electric crop sprayers were advertised and sold, but GE discontinued the product and refunded all orders in 1974 due to low demand.

A 36VDC "accessory outlet" for NEMA L2-20 twist-lock connectors, mounted under the hood overhang on the left side, is used to power handheld tools. High current draw front and mid-mounted attachments connect to a 36VDC "power take off" using a NEMA 10-50 outlet, mounted forward of the accessory outlet. The NEMA 10-50 is a heavy, thick bladed design rated for 50A at 250VAC (readily available in the 1970s in the USA for use with 240VAC electric range/ovens) that GE empirically found to be capable of the far higher currents drawn by the snowblower at 36VDC. An Anderson connector, standard on the I-5 and optionally available for other models, was mounted under the right rear fender for rear-mounted heavy current draw attachments such as the vacuums, sickle bar, and rear electric lift.

== End of production ==
After the shutdown of production at GE, Elec-Traks were produced under the Wheel Horse and Avco New Idea labels. Some time after the final shutdown of the Wheel Horse line in 1983, all remaining parts and dies were sold to Bill Gunn, a dealer in Edgerton, Wisconsin. Eventually, Gunn retired and all remaining stock was sold to Jim Coate of the Electric Tractor Store.

== See also ==
- Electric tractor
