= Andrew Cowan =

British rally driver (1936–2019)

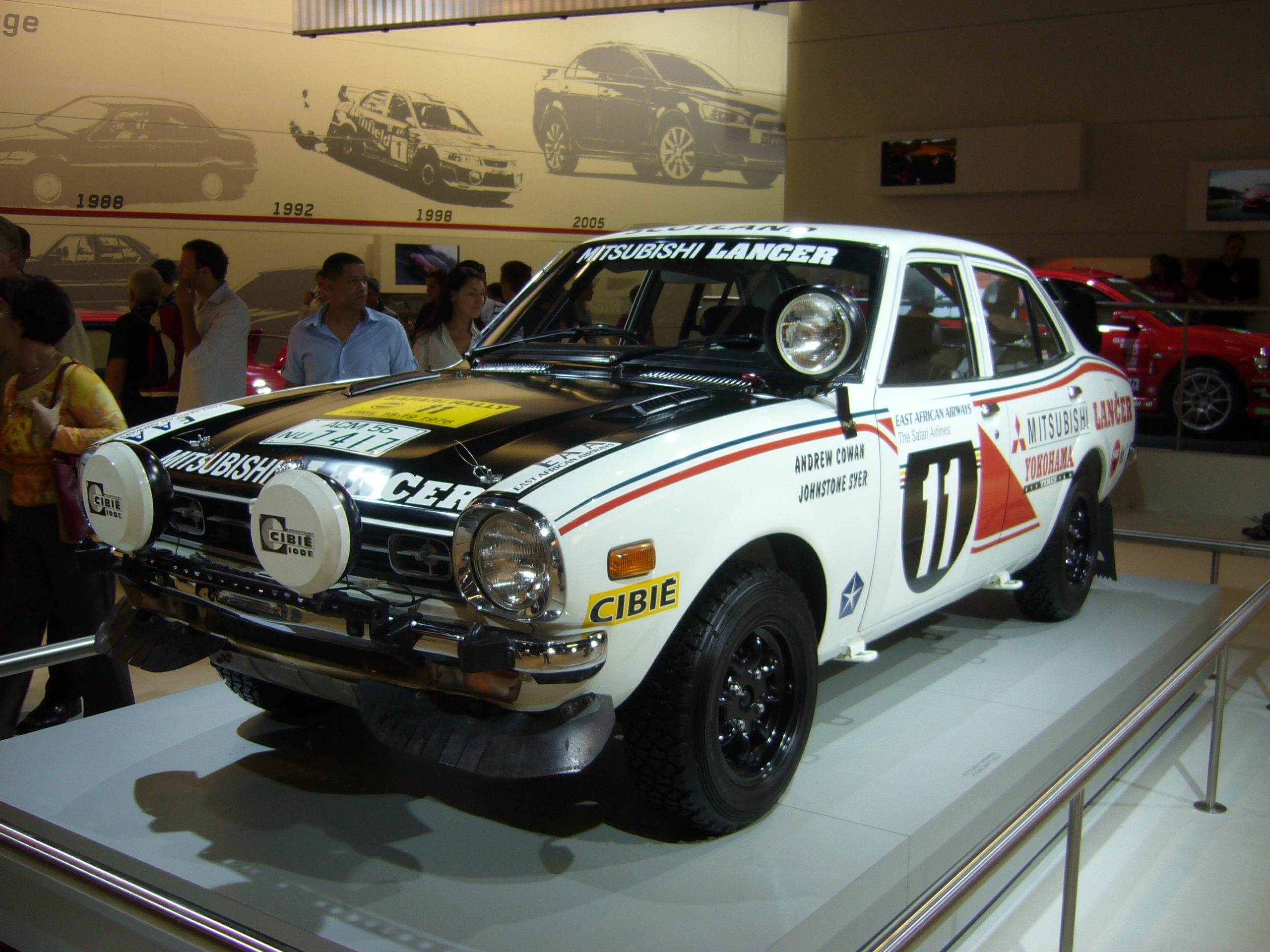
- Cowan's Mitsubishi Lancer 1600 GSR on display in Paris in 2007, as part of the launch of the Mitsubishi Lancer Evolution X.

Personal information
- Nationality: (United Kingdom) British (Scotland) Scottish
- Born: 13 December 1936
- Died: 15 October 2019 (aged 82)

World Rally Championship record
- Years active: 1973–1981
- Co-driver: (United Kingdom) Johnstone Syer (United Kingdom) Hugh McNeill (Rhodesia) John Mitchell (United Kingdom) Hamish Cardno (United Kingdom) Paul White (Germany) Klaus Kaiser (United Kingdom) Peter O'Gorman (United Kingdom) Derek Tucker
- Teams: Mitsubishi
- Rallies: 15
- Championships: 0
- Rally wins: 0
- Podiums: 2
- Total points: 28
- First rally: 1973 RAC Rally
- Last rally: 1981 RAC Rally

Andrew Cowan (13 December 1936 – 15 October 2019) was a Scottish rally driver, and the founder and senior director of Mitsubishi Ralliart until his retirement on 30 November 2005.

== Early years ==
Cowan was raised in Duns, a small town in the Scottish Borders, where he established a longstanding close friendship with future Formula One world champion Jim Clark, also a young farmer and the same age as himself. According to Cowan, their lifestyles were a great help in their subsequent careers: "We each had to have a car. We were able to drive in fields, off road, and of course through all the twisty roads around here where there was practically no traffic in those days. That definitely refined our driving skills. We had advantages that other drivers didn't."

Both men were active in the Berwick and District Motor Club during the 1950s, but while Clark gravitated to open-wheeled racing, Cowan ventured off-road, and took part in the 1960 RAC Rally, eventually finishing 43rd of over 200 starters in a Sunbeam Rapier. Impressed by his success, his father bought him a newer, more powerful Rapier as a replacement, and behind the wheel of his new vehicle, he won the 1962 Scottish Rally, an achievement he later declared to be his "Most Important Moment". He returned the following year to successfully defend his title, and as a result the Rootes Group invited him to become their 'works' driver.

== Behind the wheel ==
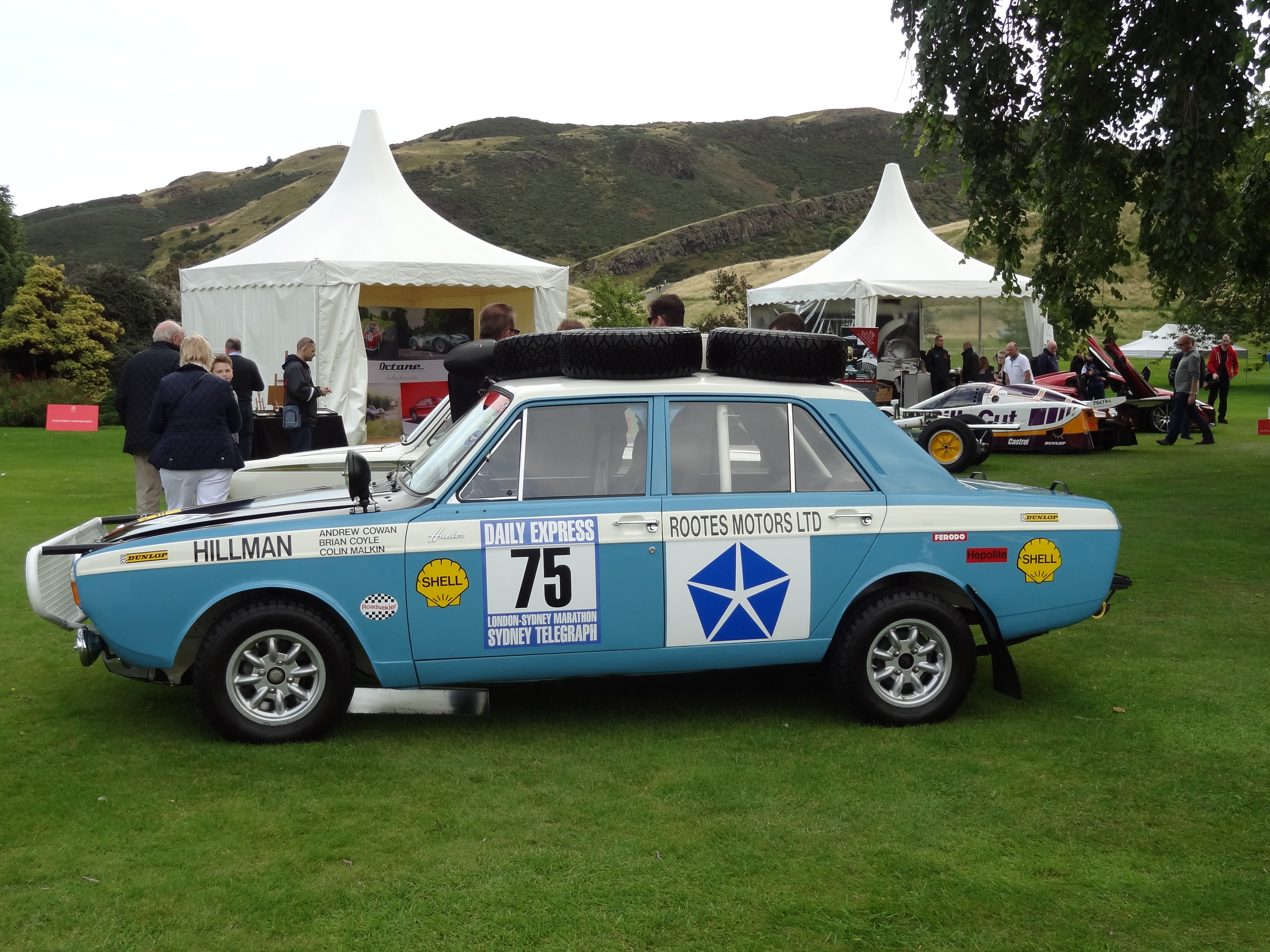
Cowan dove this Hillman Hunter to victory in the 1968 London–Sydney Marathon

Once established as a professional driver, Cowan had many notable successes with both Rootes and subsequently Mitsubishi, for whom he signed in 1972. Aside from his two Scottish Rally titles, he won the first two London-Sydney Marathons in 1968 and 1977, five consecutive Southern Cross Rallies (1972–76), the 1977 Rallye Bandama Côte d'Ivoire, and the world's longest rally, the 20,000-mile South American Marathon in 1978. He was also competitive in the Safari Rally where he recorded a top four finish four times in five years, and latterly the Paris-Dakar Rally where his best result was second overall in 1985. He retired as a driver in 1990.

For his achievements in 1977, Cowan was awarded the British Guild of Motoring Writers' Driver of the Year Award, the Jim Clark Memorial Trophy for "outstanding achievement by a Scottish driver", and the British Racing Drivers' Club's John Cobb Trophy for a British driver of outstanding success.

== Behind a desk ==
In 1983, Mitsubishi Motors asked him to establish a European base for their motorsport activities, and so he founded Andrew Cowan Motorsports (ACMS). Based in Rugby, Warwickshire, it would evolve into Mitsubishi Ralliart Europe, and his cars took Tommi Mäkinen to four consecutive WRC Drivers' titles (1996 to 1999), as well as winning Mitsubishi their only manufacturers' crown in 1998.

In 2003, Mitsubishi Motors officially took over the business and renamed it Mitsubishi Motorsport, although Cowan remained as "Sporting Advisor" for the next two years until his retirement aged 69.

In September 2008, Cowan took part in the Colin McRae Forest Stages Rally, a round of the Scottish Rally Championship. He was one of a number of former rally drivers to take part in the event in memory of McRae, who died in 2007.

== Death ==
Beset by poor health in his later years, Cowan died in Borders General Hospital in Melrose on 15 October 2019, succumbing to illness after initially being admitted for a fall where he fractured his hip.
