= Toyota Corolla (E20) =

Second generation of Toyota Corolla

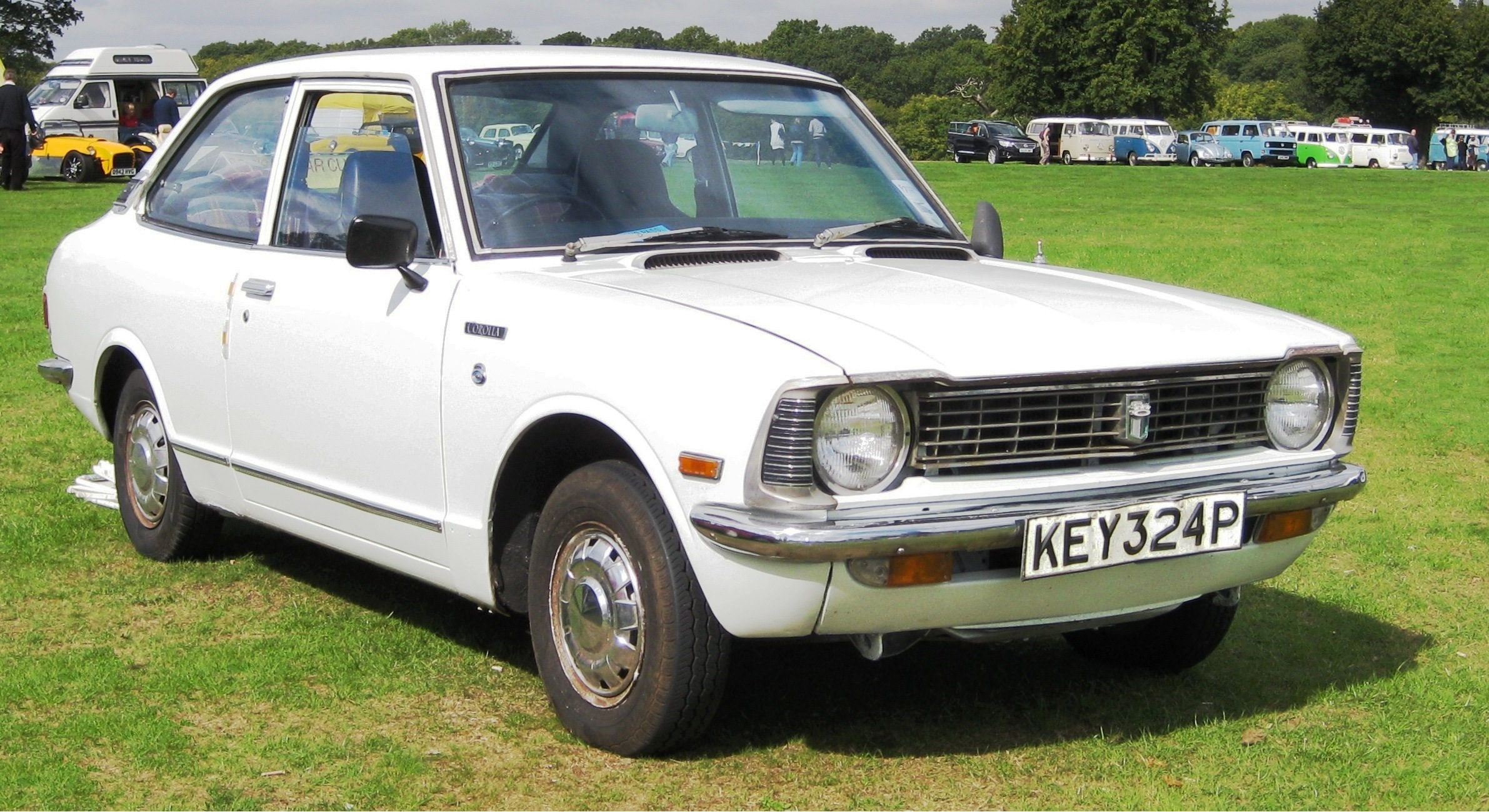
- Toyota Corolla E20 2-door sedan

Overview
- Model code: E20
- Also called: Toyota Sprinter
- Production: May 1970 – July 1974 (coupe/sedan); May 1970 – May 1978 (wagon/van)
- Assembly: Japan: Toyota City; Australia: Port Melbourne, Victoria (Australian Motor Industries); Canada: Sydney, Nova Scotia (CMI); Indonesia: North Jakarta (Toyota Astra Motor); Ireland: Bluebell, Dublin; Malaysia: Shah Alam; New Zealand: Thames (Toyota New Zealand); Philippines: Parañaque (Delta Motors Corporation); Thailand: Samut Prakan (Toyota Motor Thailand)
- Designer: Shiro Sasaki (1967)

Body and chassis
- Body style: 2-door coupé; 2/4-door sedan; 3/5-door station wagon; 3/5-door van
- Layout: FR layout
- Related: Daihatsu Charmant

Powertrain
- Engine: 1.2 L 3K I4; 1.4 L T I4; 1.6 L 2T I4
- Transmission: 4/5-speed manual; 2/3-speed automatic

Dimensions
- Wheelbase: 2,335 mm (91.9 in)
- Length: 3,945 mm (155.3 in) (coupé); 3,990 mm (157.1 in) (van)
- Width: 1,506 mm (59.3 in)
- Height: 1,346 mm (53 in)
- Curb weight: 730 to 910 kg (1,609 to 2,006 lb)

Chronology
- Predecessor: Corolla E10
- Successor: Corolla E30

The Corolla E20 was the second generation of cars sold by Toyota under the Corolla nameplate. Launched in May 1970, it featured "coke bottle styling" and had a longer 2,335 mm (91.9 in) wheelbase. The front suspension design was improved greatly, using a swaybar, however the rear remained relatively similar. The Corolla became the second-best selling car in the world that year. Grades for sedan were Standard, Deluxe, and Hi-Deluxe. The coupé was offered in Deluxe, SL, SR, and Levin ("levin" is Old English for "lightning") trim levels.

== History ==
Minor changes were made in September 1971 with a new grille, turn signal lights, and tail lights, along with similar treatment to the Sprinter. A further facelift was done in August 1972. The E20 Corolla was also used as the basis for the 1974 Daihatsu Charmant. The E20 series was the first Corolla marketed in Indonesia, where it was sold between 1971 and 1975.

== Japan (1970–1978) ==
Most models stopped production in July 1974 but the KE26 wagon and van were still marketed in Japan alongside the new 30-series, until production finally ended in May 1978.

Load carrying duties of the Corolla Van were lightened by the arrival of the all new Toyota TownAce in 1976, while its twin the Toyota LiteAce was sold at Toyota Auto Store locations next to the Sprinter, with both vehicles using the Corolla/Sprinter 1200 cc 3K-J, and 1600 cc 2T-J and 12T-U engines. Vehicles installed with the 1.6-litre engine were ranked as the top level trim package, as the engine displacement obligated Japanese owners to pay more annual road tax.

The sporting Levin was originally only available with the twin-cam engine; in late 1973 this was joined by the somewhat cheaper and less powerful "Levin J", with the SOHC 2T-B engine. Levin production levels were around 5000 per year. In addition to a variety of other performance upgrades, the Levin has fender extensions and a quicker steering rack than other Corollas, while the Twin Cam versions lack servo brakes so as to make for a sportier feel for the driver.

Japanese engines:

- 3K – 1.2 L (1166 cc) I4, 8-valve OHV, carb, 68 PS (50 kW)
- 3K-D – 1.2 L (1166 cc) I4, 8-valve OHV, carb, 73 PS (54 kW)
- 3K-B – 1.2 L (1166 cc) I4, 8-valve OHV, twin carb, 77 PS (57 kW)
- T – 1.4 L (1407 cc) I4, 8-valve OHV, carb, 86 PS (63 kW)
- T-D – 1.4 L (1407 cc) I4, 8-valve OHV, carb, 90 PS (66 kW)
- T-B – 1.4 L (1407 cc) I4, 8-valve OHV, twin carb, 95 PS (70 kW)
- 2T-B – 1.6 L (1588 cc) I4, 8-valve OHV, twin carb, 105 PS (77 kW)
- 2T-G – 1.6 L (1588 cc) I4, 8-valve DOHC, twin carb, 115 PS (85 kW)
- 2T-GR – 1.6 L (1588 cc) I4, 8-valve DOHC, twin carb, 110 PS (81 kW)

JPN-market chassis:

- KE20 – 1,166 cc Sedan, 2-door/4-door (Std, DX, Hi-DX)
- TE20 – 1,407 cc Sedan, 2-door/4-door (Std, DX, Hi-DX)
- TE21 – 1,588 cc Sedan, 2-door/4-door
- KE25 – 1,166 cc Coupé (DX, Hi-DX, SL)
- TE25 – 1,407 cc Coupé (DX, Hi-DX, SL, SR)
- TE27 – 1,588 cc Coupé (Levin)
- KE26V – 1,166 cc Wagon/Van, 3-door/5-door (Std, DX)
- TE28 – 1,588 cc Wagon, 5-door

Export engines:

- 3K – 1.2 L (1,166 cc) I4, 8-valve OHV, carb, 58 PS (43 kW) (DIN) / 68 PS (50 kW) (SAE)
- 3K-H – 1.2 L (1,166 cc) I4, 8-valve OHV, carb, 55 PS (40 kW) (DIN) - desmogged version, introduced in fall of 1974
- 2T – 1.6 L (1,588 cc) I4, 8-valve OHV, carb, 75 PS (55 kW) (DIN)

In some years and in some export markets, SAE outputs were used. In the UK, the standard 3K engine produced a claimed 73 hp (54 kW) at 6,000 rpm, while the twin-carb 3K-B engine installed in the Coupé offered 83 hp (62 kW) at 6,600 rpm.

== North America (1970–1974) ==
In the United States, most body styles were available, although the 1.4-litre and twincam engines were never offered. An optional 1,588 cc (97 cu in) engine with an SAE gross output of 102 hp (76 kW) was added in September 1970. Either a four-speed manual or a two- or three-speed automatic were offered, until sporty five-speed coupés called the S-5 and SR-5 were introduced in 1972. In 1974, an SR-5 was entered by Car & Driver magazine's team in SCCA competition.

The E20 Corolla was also assembled in Sydney, Nova Scotia by Canadian Motor Industries (CMI). CMI only ever assembled small numbers of Toyotas, as the finished cars cost ten percent more than a fully built up import and their quality was inferior; in 1974 Atlantic Canadian dealerships refused delivery of Canadian-assembled Corollas as a result. CMI ended operations in November 1975, after nearly 8,000 cars had been built there. The production tools were transferred to Ireland, where local assembly of the E20 Corolla had begun in February 1973.

American engines (SAE norms):

- 3K-C – 1.2 L (1,166 cc) I4, 8-valve OHV, carb, 73 hp (54 kW) gross / 65 hp (48 kW) net at 6,000 rpm
- 2T-C – 1.6 L (1,588 cc) I4, 8-valve OHV, carb, 102 hp (76 kW) gross / 88 hp (66 kW) net at 6,000 rpm

US-market chassis:

- KE20 - 2-door Sedan (Std.)
- TE21 – 2-door/4-door Sedan
- TE26 – Wagon
- TE27 – Coupé (S-5, SR-5)

== Gallery ==
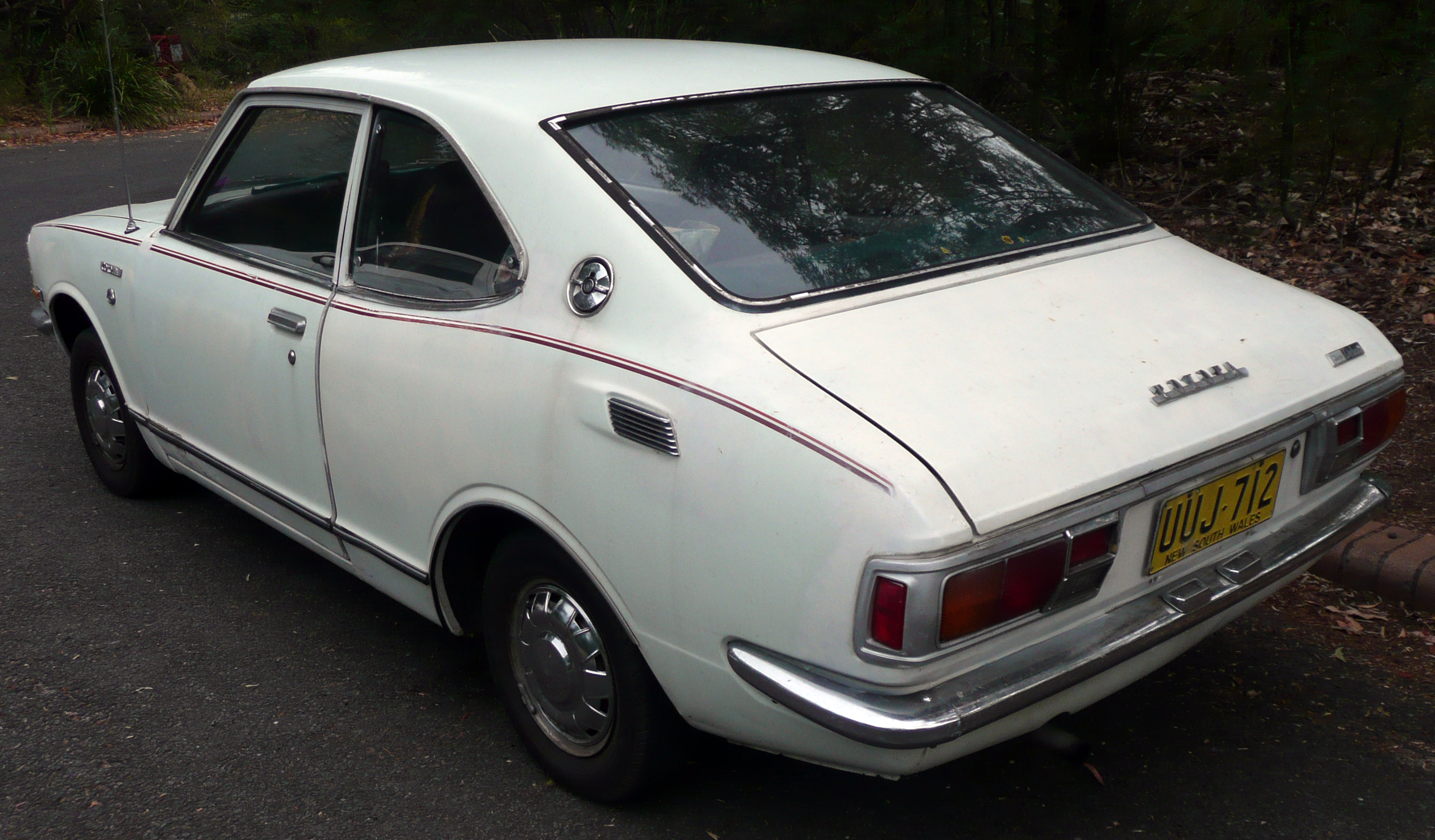
Coupe

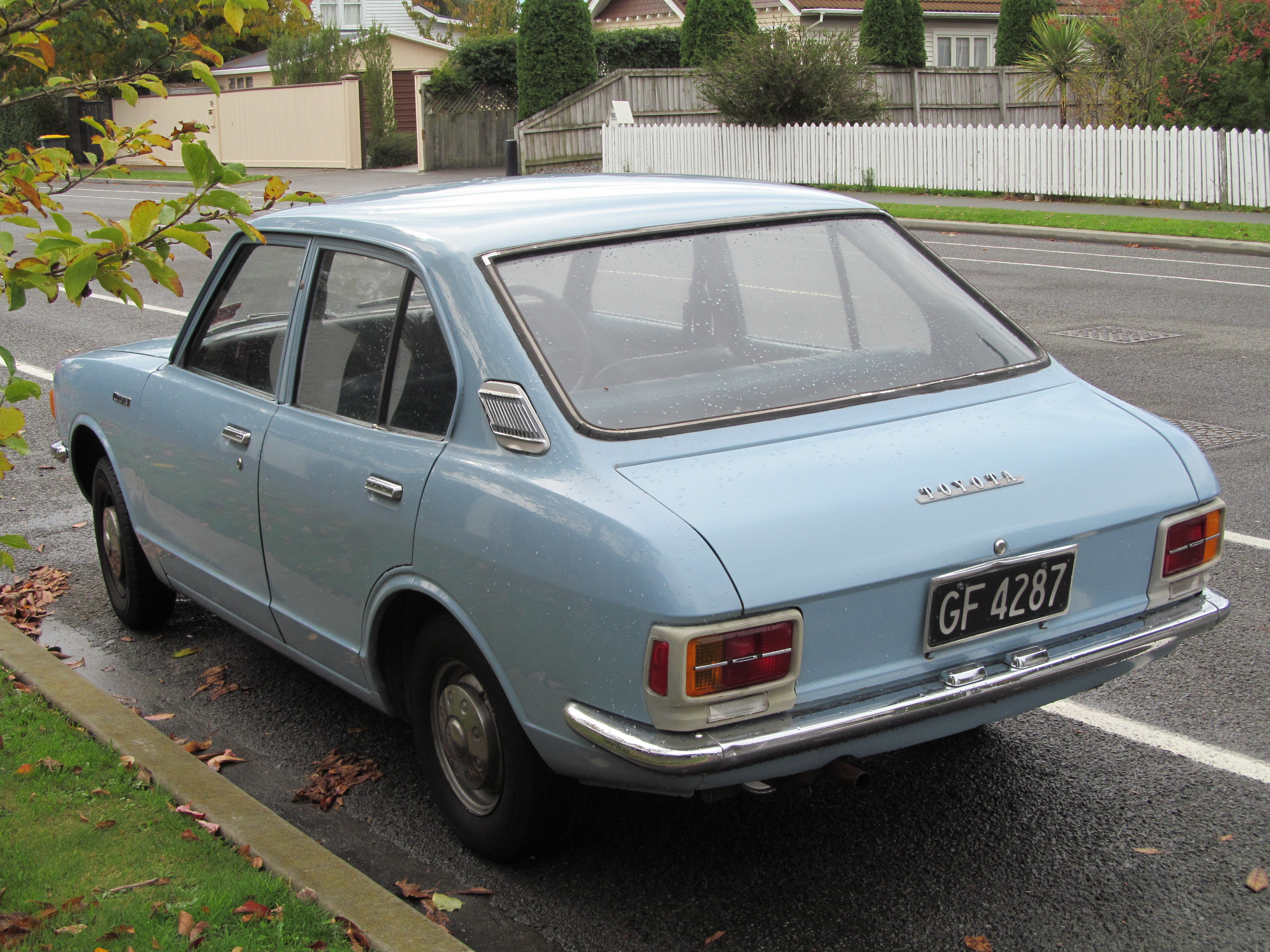
4-door Sedan

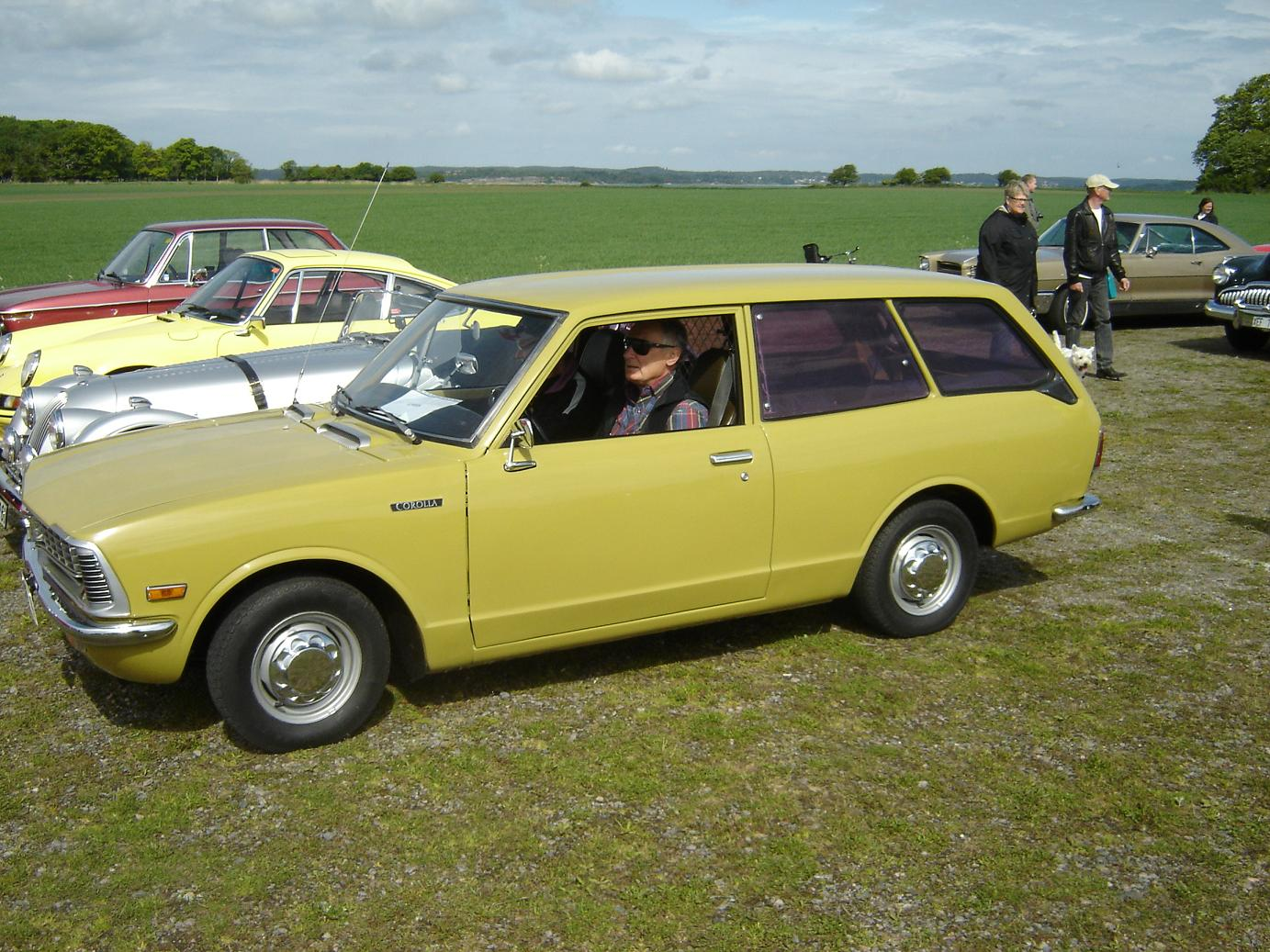
3-door wagon

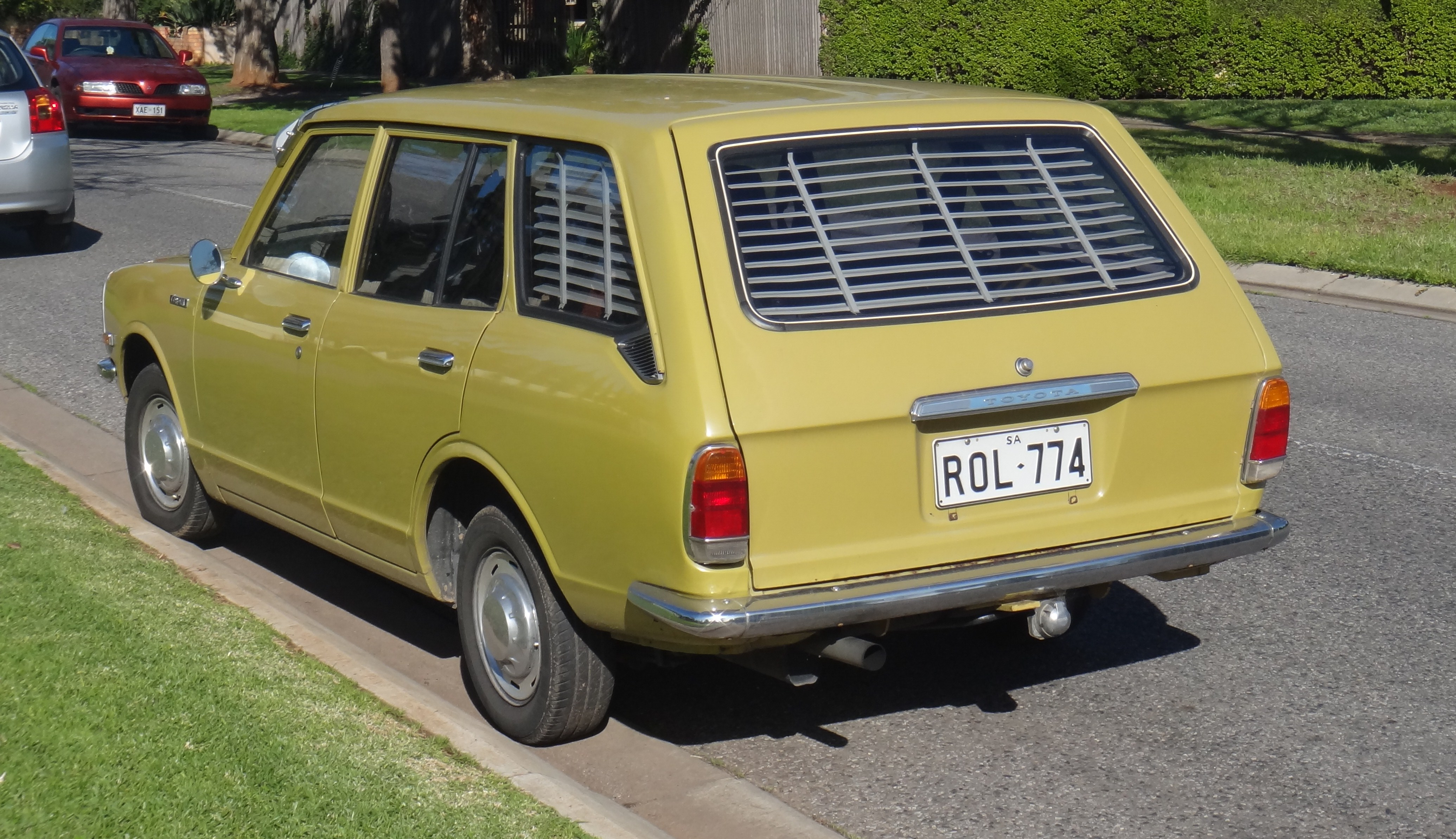
5-door wagon

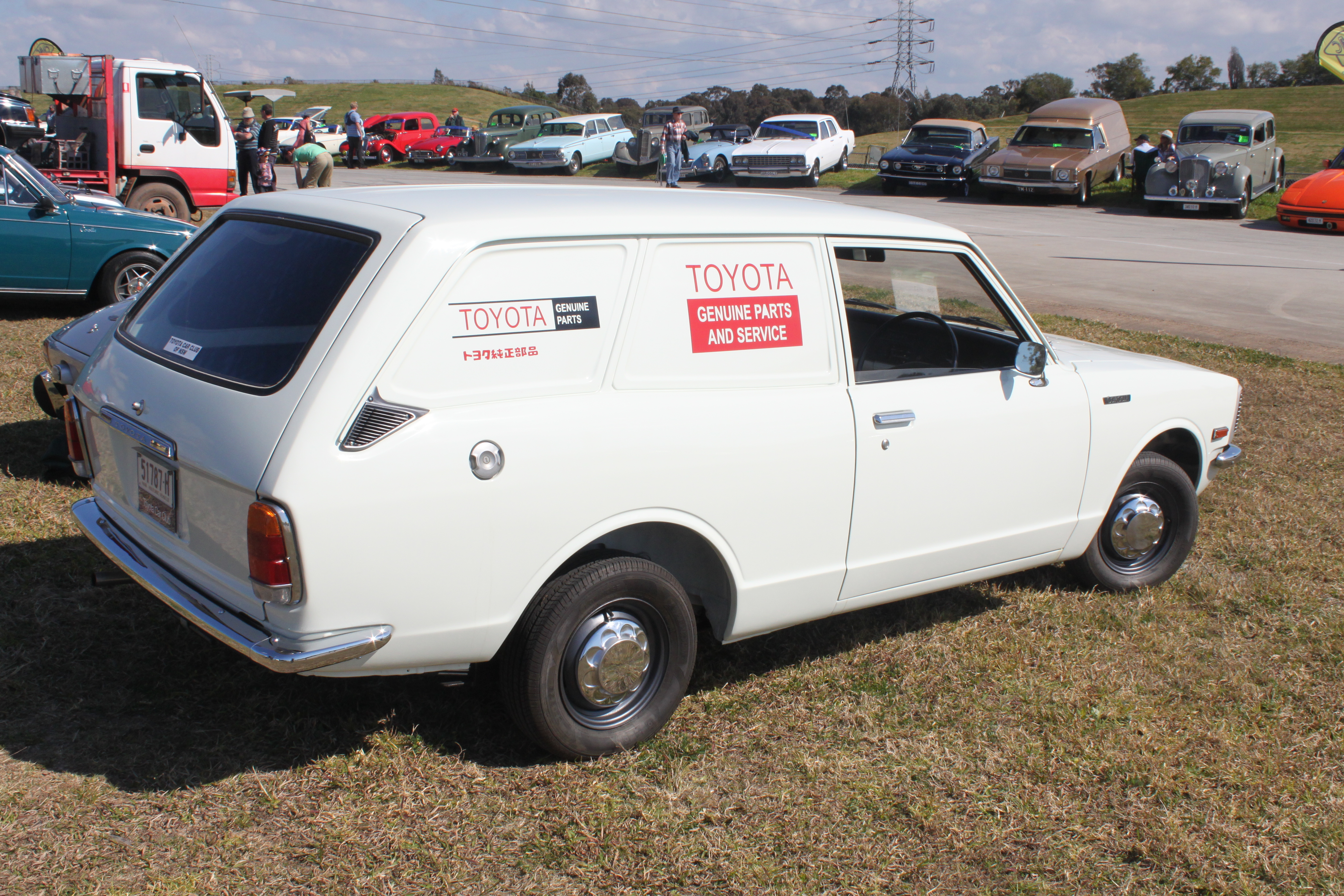
Van
