= 1985 Australian Rally Championship =

Series of rallying events in Australia

Seasons
- ← 1984 1986 →

The 1985 Australian Rally Championship was a series of six rallying events held across Australia. It was the 18th season in the history of the competition.

Barry Lowe and navigator Kevin Pedder in the Subaru RX Turbo won the 1985 Championship.

== Season review ==
The 18th Australian Rally Championship was held over six events across Australia, the season consisting of one event each for New South Wales, Victoria, Queensland, South Australia, Tasmania and West Australia. This was the first time an ARC round was conducted in Tasmania, making it a truly Australian wide series. The 1985 season saw the Group A cars finally come into their own, with many crews making the change to the new category, but more importantly the first championship won by a Group A car. It was a tightly fought season with only three points separating first and second after the six events.

== The Rallies ==
The six events of the 1985 season were as follows.

Round	Rally	Date
1	The Advocate – Fairfield Stages Rally (TAS)	13–14 April 1985
2	Western Mail – Nissan Rally (WA)	11–12 May 1985
3	Mobil Dealers Rally of the Valley (NSW)	9–10 June 1985
4	The Keema Classic Rally (QLD)	6–7 July 1985
5	The Tile Supplies Rally (SA)	19–20 October 1985
6	Akademos Rally (VIC)	16–17 November 1985

=== Round One – The Advocate – Fairfield Stages Rally ===
Position	Driver	Navigator	Car	Penalties
1	Hugh Bell	Steve Ellis	Mazda RX-7	238.57
2	Ian Hill	Phillip Bonser	Ford Escort RS	243.19
3	Andrew Murfett	Phillip Welch	Mazda RX-2	245.24
4	Barry Lowe	Kevin Pedder	Subaru RX Turbo	255.34
5	Andrew Lawson	Paul Kettle	Datsun 1600	258.59
6	Ron Cremmen	Ray Temple	Toyota Sprinter	259.28

=== Round Two – Western Mail – Nissan Rally ===
Position	Driver	Navigator	Car	Penalties
1	Ross Dunkerton	Steve McKimmie	Subaru RX Turbo	235.37
2	Mark Anderson	Peter Baesjou	Datsun	240.32
3	John Macara	David Hatley	Datsun	240.40
4	Peter Clark	Wayne Kenny	Subaru RX Turbo	243.41
5	Brian Smith	David MacKenzie	Mitsubishi Sigma	244.28
6	Robb Herridge	Colin Eckert	Datsun	244.57

=== Round Three – Mobil Dealers Rally of the Valley ===
Position	Driver	Navigator	Car	Penalties
1	Hugh Bell	Steve Ellis	Mazda RX-7	190.33
2	Ron McKinnon	David Kelley	Datsun 1600	194.46
3	John Atkinson	Geoff Jones	Subaru RX Turbo	194.48
4	Mark Hankinson	Steve Owers	Datsun 1600	195.01
5	Ian Hill	Phillip Bonser	Ford Escort RS	195.35
6	Barry Lowe	Kevin Pedder	Subaru RX Turbo	195.38

=== Round Four – The Keema Classic Rally ===
Position	Driver	Navigator	Car	Penalties
1	Murray Coote	Iain Stewart	Mazda 323	92.49
2	Gregg Hansford	Dale Payne	Mazda RX-7	95.23
3	Ron Cremmen	Ray Temple	Toyota Sprinter	121.01
4	Denis Brown	John Hall		122.12
5	David Adam	Chris Randell		123.21
6	Mark Taylor	Noel Drummond		123.34

=== Round Five – The Tile Supplies Rally ===
Position	Driver	Navigator	Car	Penalties
1	Barry Lowe	Kevin Pedder	Subaru RX Turbo	147.42
2	Brian Smith	David MacKenzie	Mitsubishi Sigma	147.51
3	Ed Ordynski	Lyn Wilson	Subaru RX Turbo	148.17
4	Andrew Murfett	Pip Welsh	Mazda RX-2	149.48
5	Peter Clark	Wayne Kenny	Subaru RX Turbo	151.41
6	George Fury	Monty Suffern	Datsun 1600	153.56

=== Round Six – Akademos Rally ===
Position	Driver	Navigator	Car	Penalties
1	Hugh Bell	Steve Ellis	Mazda RX-7	77.12
2	Barry Lowe	Kevin Pedder	Subaru RX Turbo	78.32
3	Wayne Bell	David Boddy	Toyota Sprinter	78.39
4	Peter Clark	Wayne Kenny	Subaru RX Turbo	78.43
5	Terry Harris	Bryan Oliver	Ford Escort	79.12
6	Brian Smith	John Birrell	Mitsubishi Sigma	79.44

== 1985 Drivers and Navigators championships ==
Final pointscore for 1985 is as follows.

=== Barry Lowe – Champion Driver 1985 ===
Position	Driver	Car	Points
1	Barry Lowe	Subaru RX Turbo	
2	Hugh Bell	Mazda RX-7	
3	Peter Clark	Subaru RX Turbo	
=4	Brian Smith	Mitsubishi Sigma	
=4	Ron Cremmen	Toyota Sprinter	
6	Graham Alexander	Toyota Sprinter	

=== Kevin Pedder – Champion Navigator 1985 ===
Position	Navigator	Car	Points
1	Kevin Pedder	Subaru RX Turbo	
2	Steve Ellis	Mazda RX-7	
3	Wayne Kenny	Subaru RX Turbo	
=4	Ray Temple	Toyota Sprinter	
=4	David MacKenzie	Mitsubishi Sigma	
6	Jon Thompson	Holden Commodore	
