= Mitsubishi Sigma =

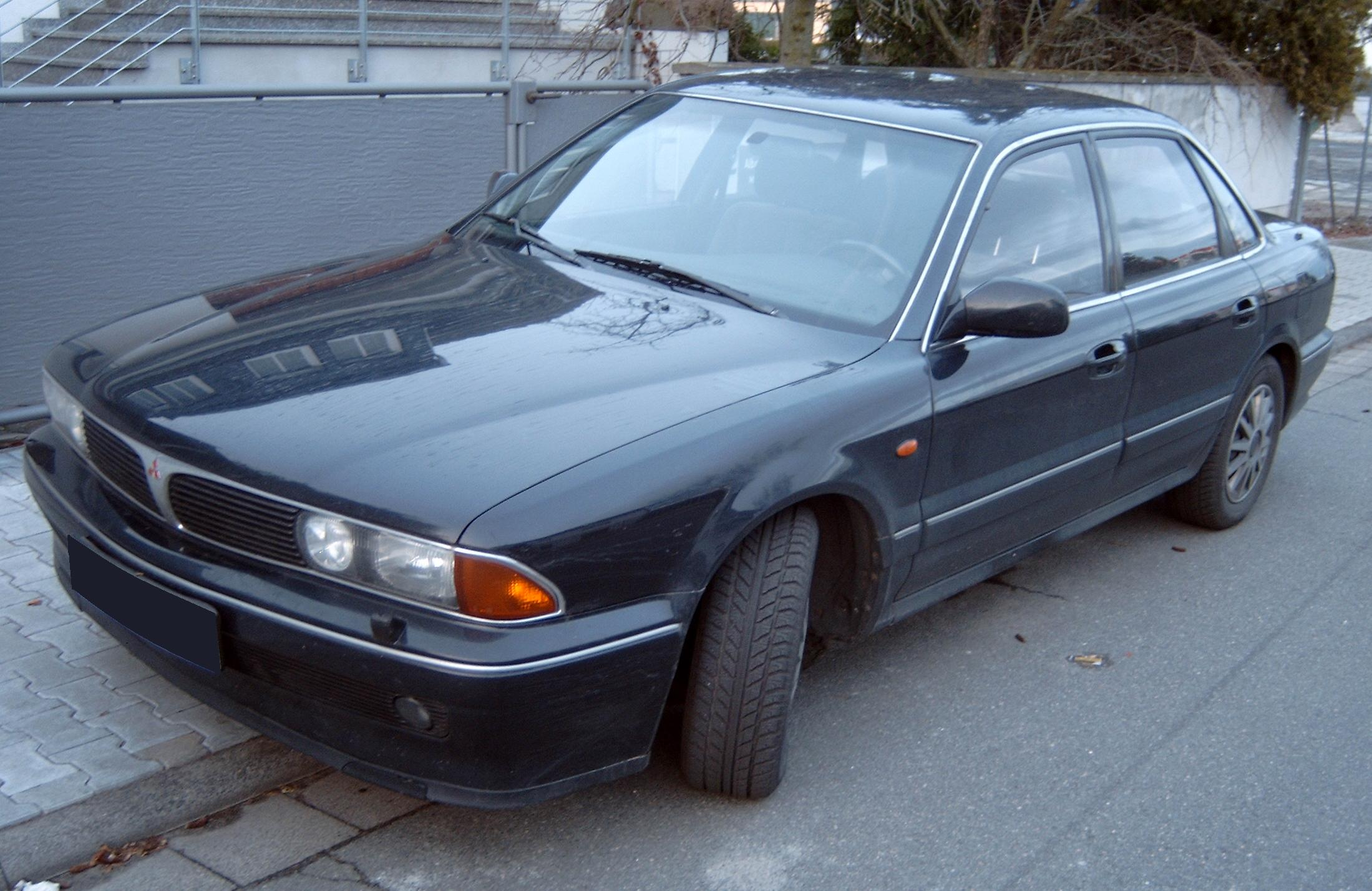
1991-1996 Mitsubishi Sigma

Mitsubishi Sigma is a model name that was used by the Japanese automobile manufacturer Mitsubishi Motors between 1976 and 1996. Mitsubishi has utilized the "Sigma" name on several different vehicles based on Mitsubishi Galant and Mitsubishi Diamante sold in various markets during this time. The GSX-R 2.0 turbo model was fitted with a Single Overhead Cam cyclone motor which was the precursor to the infamous 4G63T twin cam motor.

== Mitsubishi Galant based ==
=== Japan (Galant Σ) ===
Between 1976 and 1987 over three generations, the Mitsubishi Galant sedan sold in Japan was suffixed with the "Σ" (sigma) badge.

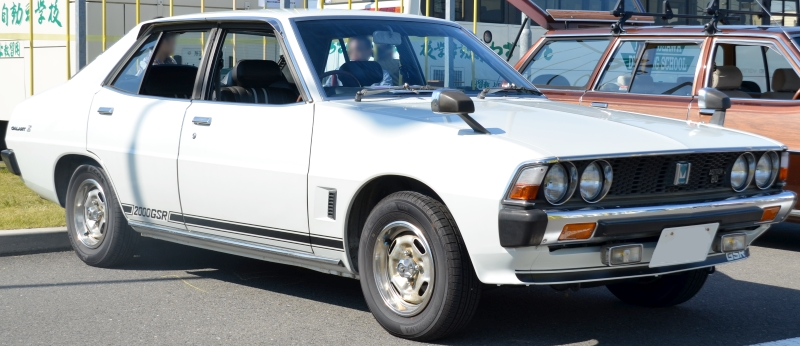
1976–1980

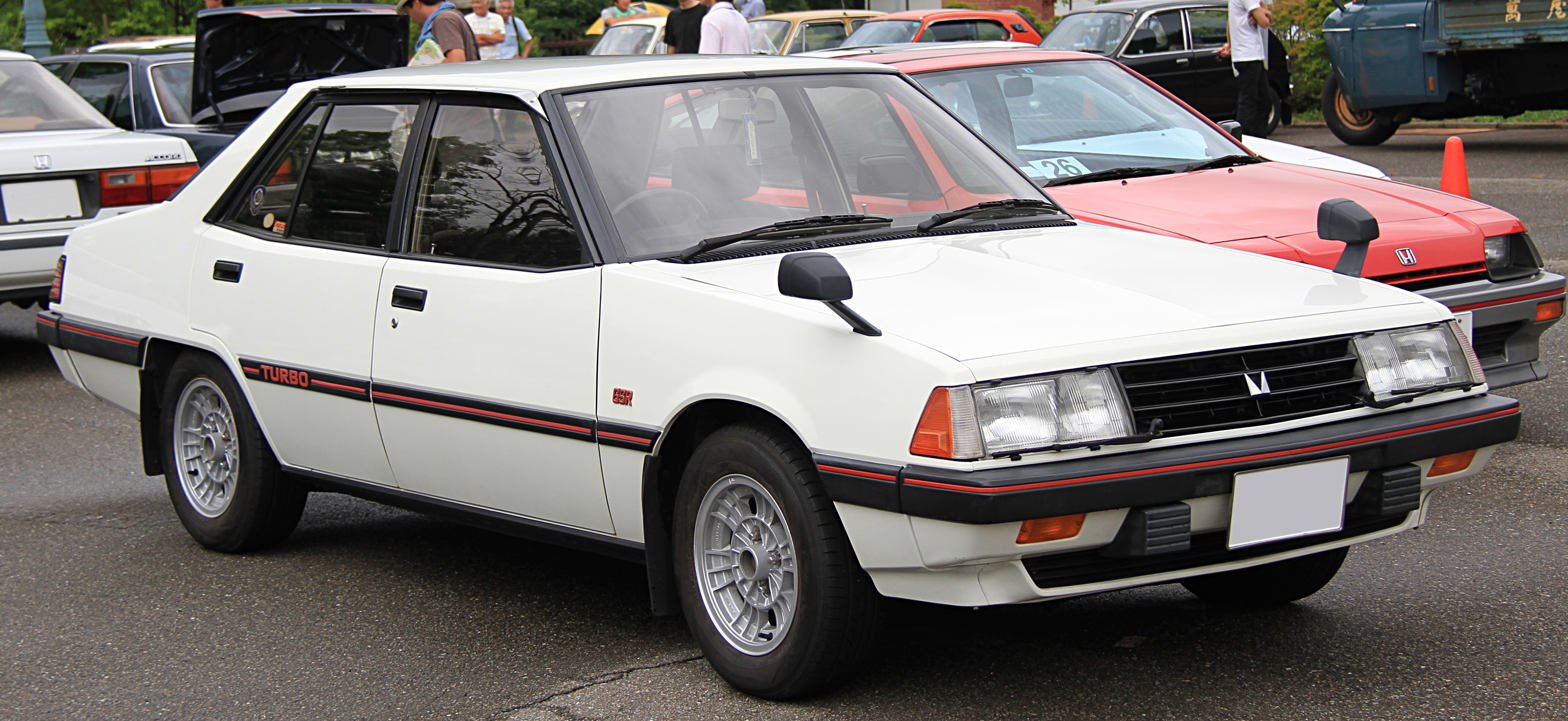
1980–1984

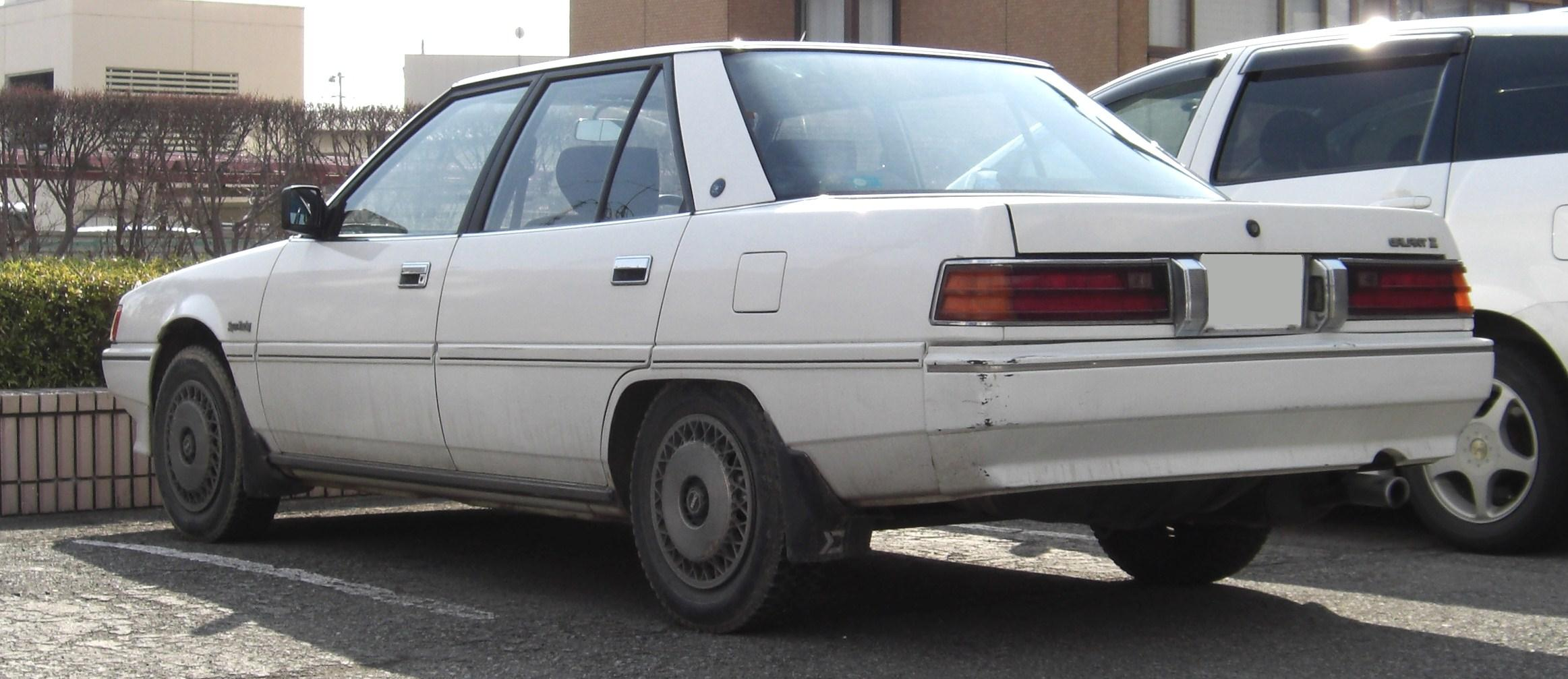
1983–1987

=== Australia ===
Between 1980 and 1987 over two generations, the version of the Mitsubishi Galant sedan and station wagon produced and sold in Australia retailed under the Mitsubishi Sigma name. Between 1977 and 1980, prior to Mitsubishi taking over Chrysler Australia's operations, this model had been marketed as the Chrysler Sigma.

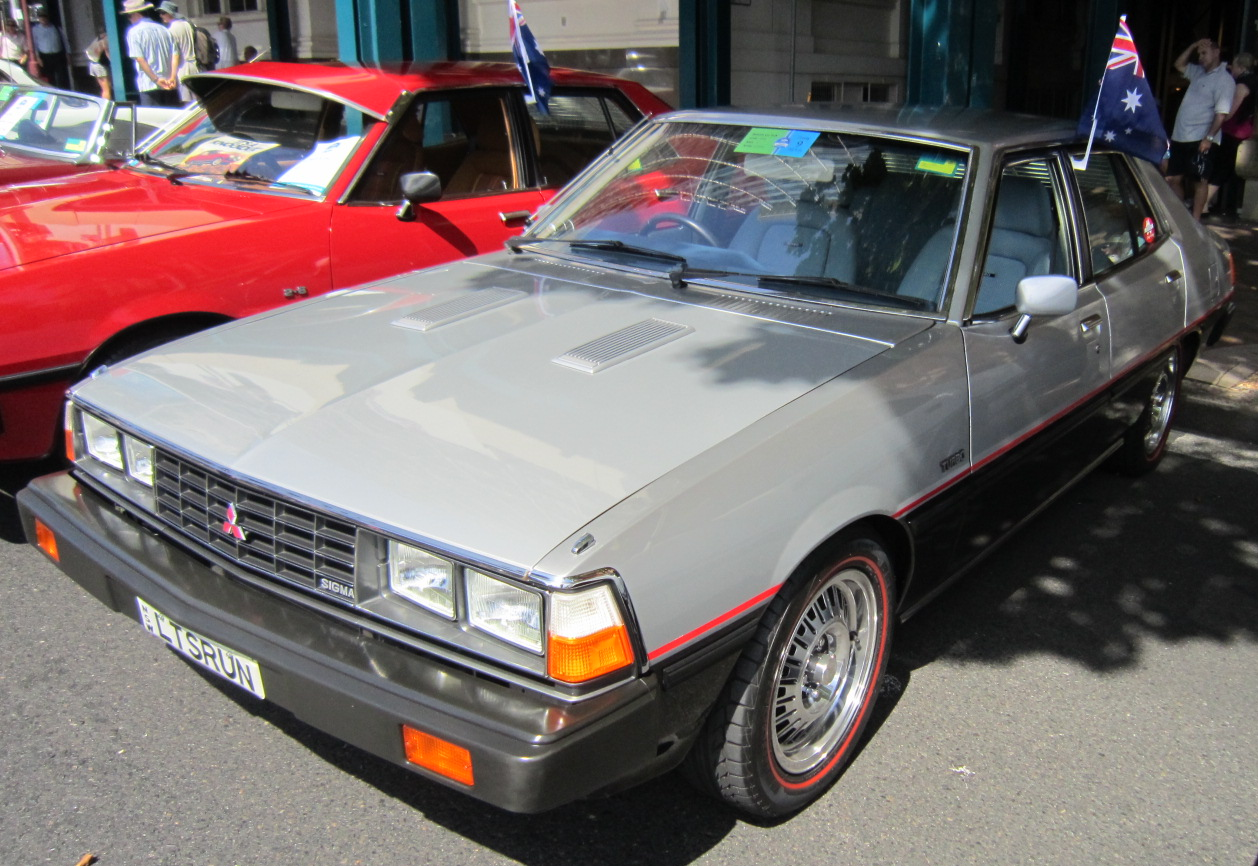
1980–1982 (GH)

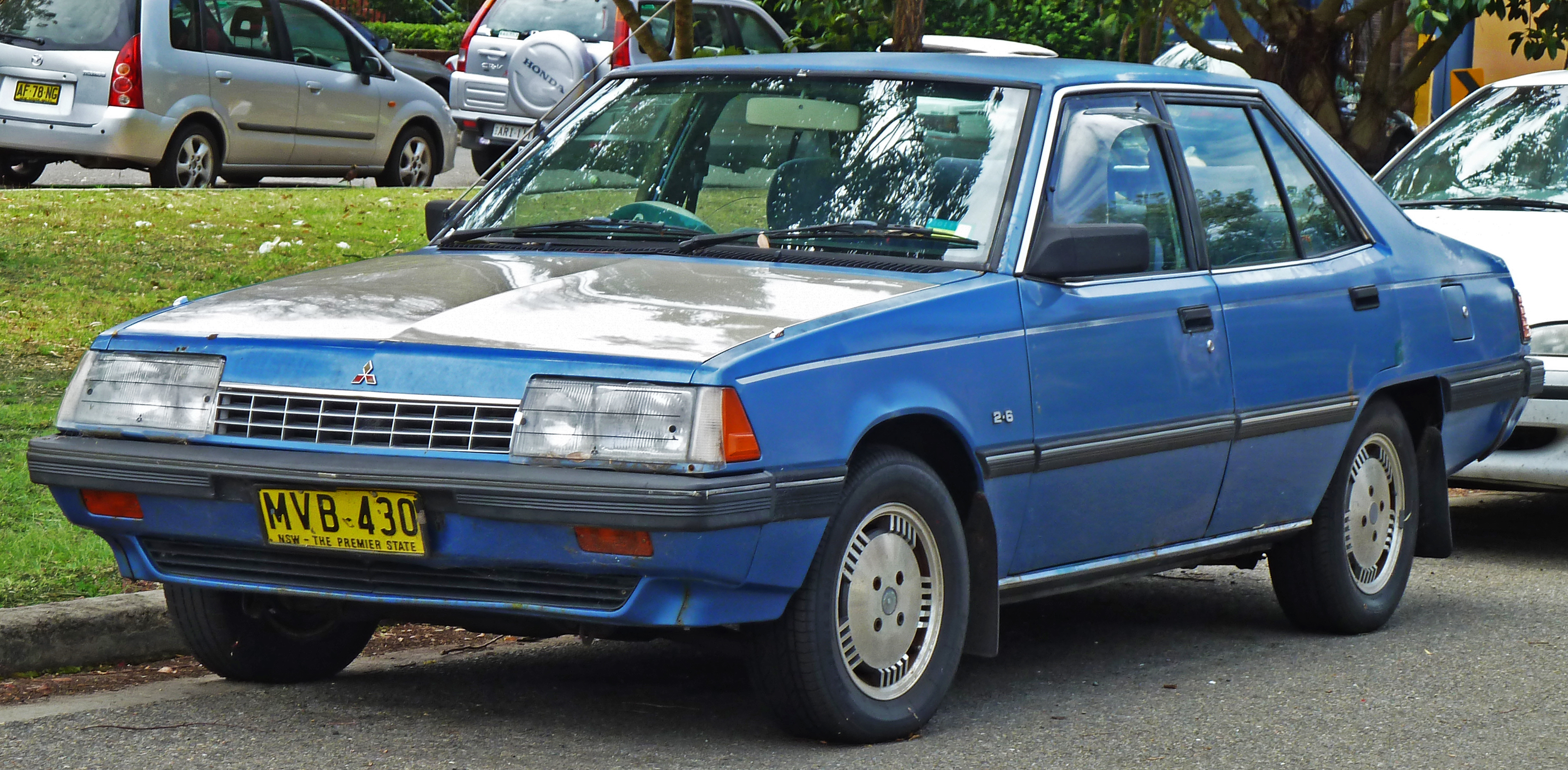
1982–1987 (GJ, GK, GN)

=== New Zealand ===
Between c. 1977 and c. 1988 over three generations, the version of the Mitsubishi Galant sedan and station wagon sold in New Zealand retailed under the Mitsubishi Sigma name.

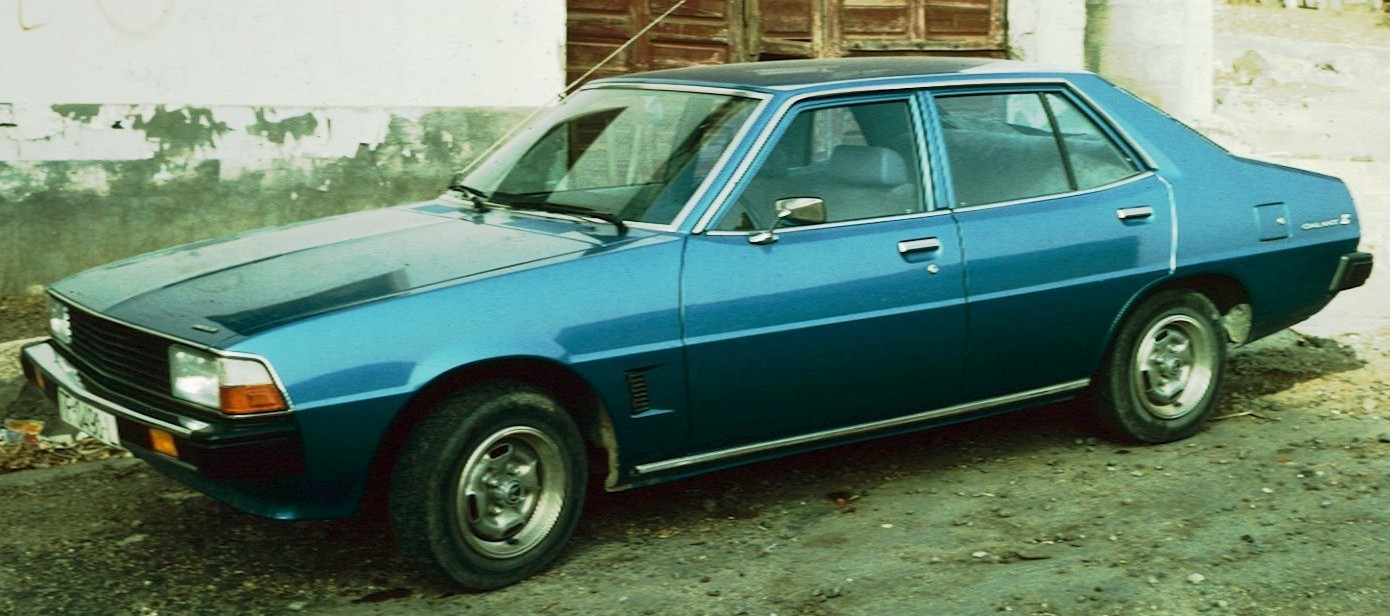
1977–1981

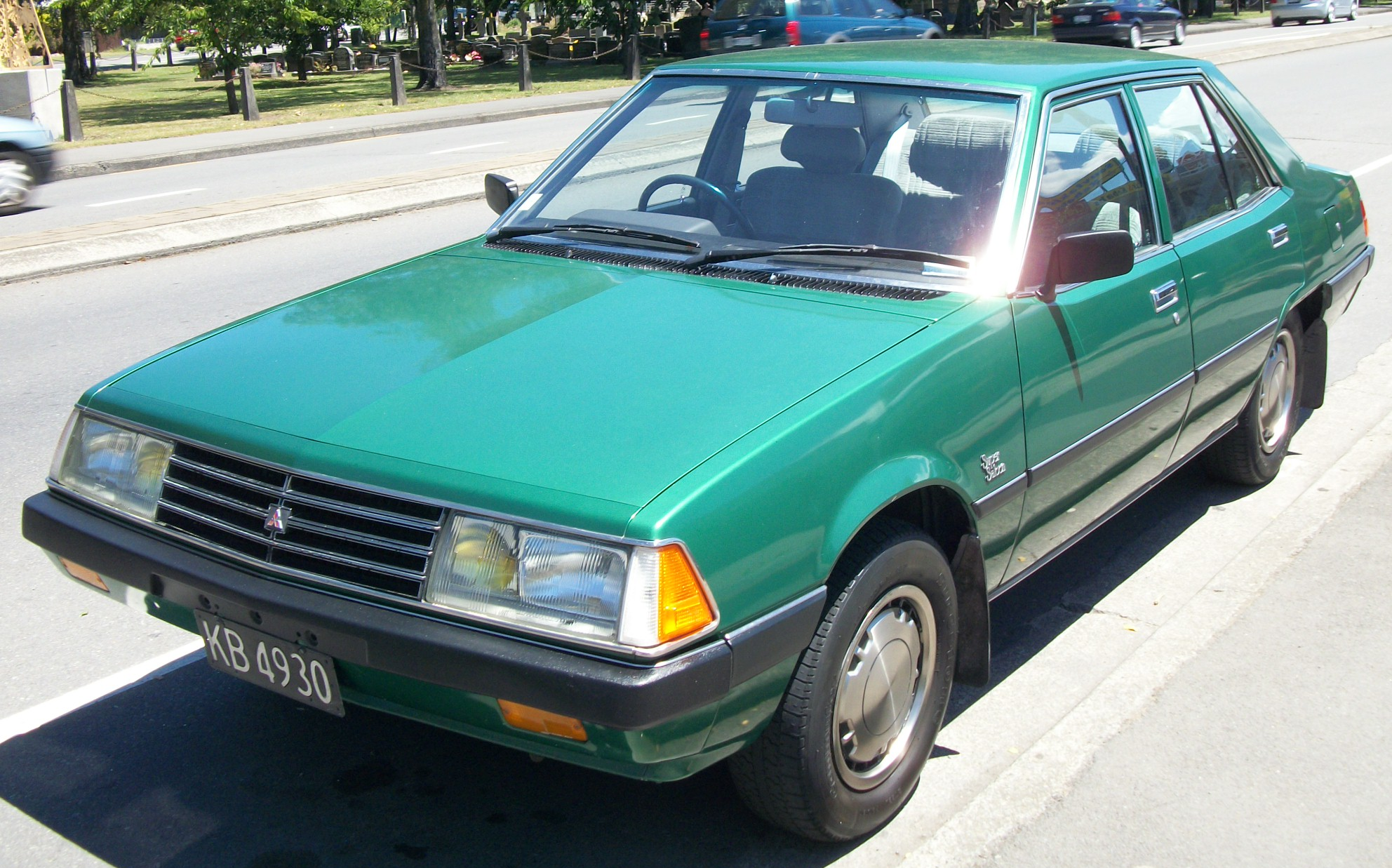
1981–1984

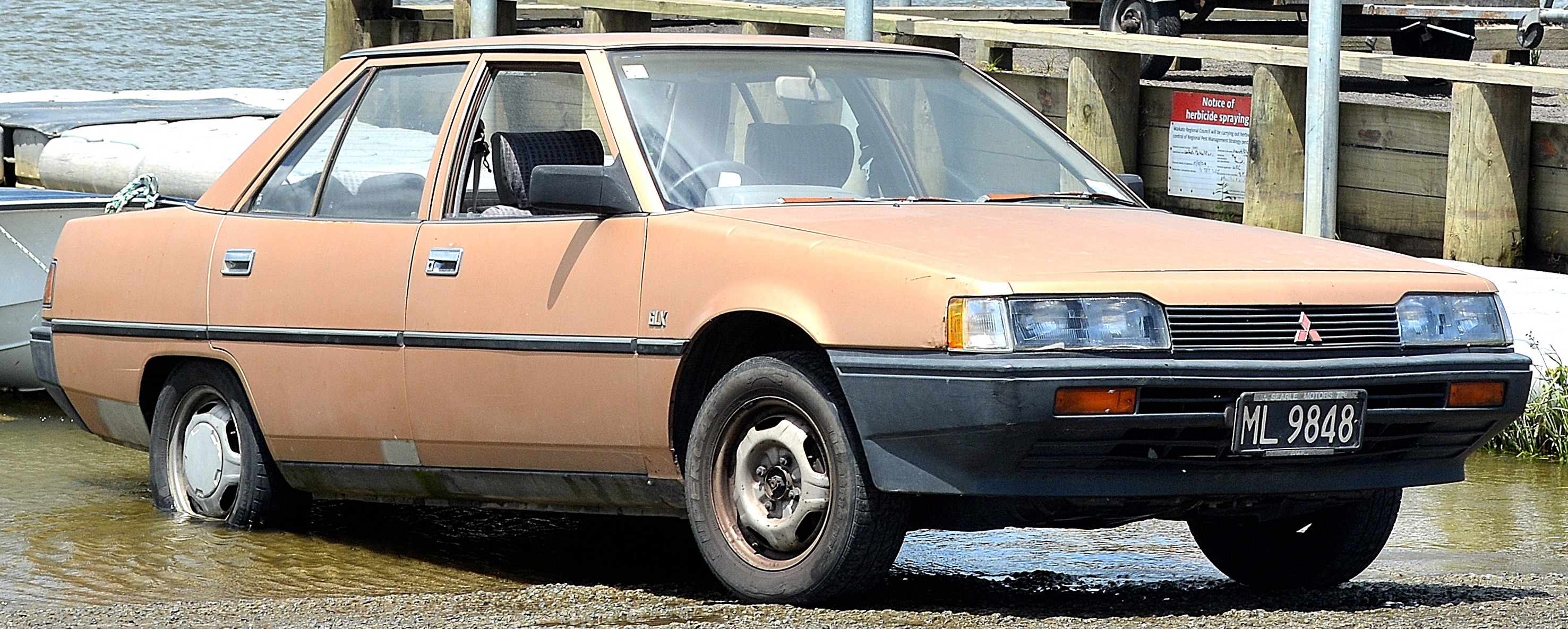
1984–1988

=== North America ===
The sedan bodywork of the Mitsubishi Galant (fifth generation) was sold in North America from 1985 for the 1986 model year as the Mitsubishi Galant Σ (sigma), and from 1988 to 1990 for the 1989 and 1990 model years as the Mitsubishi Sigma.

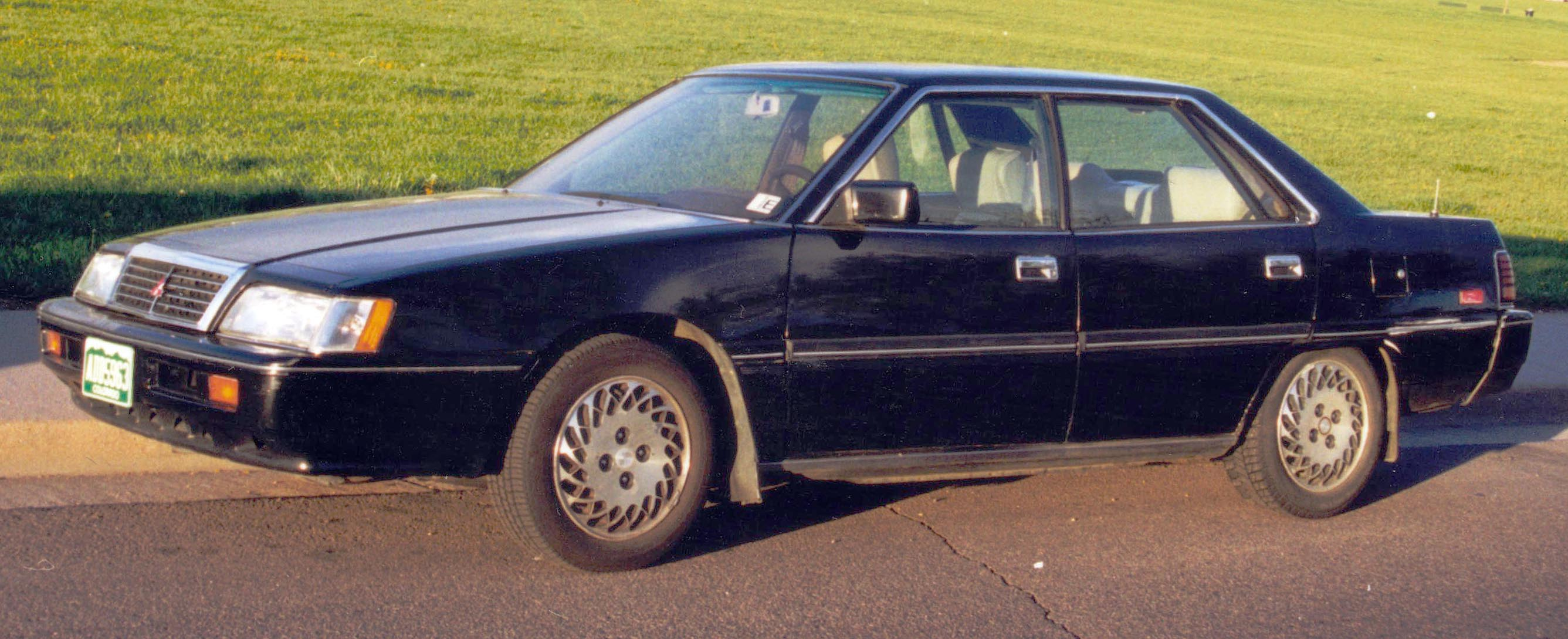
Galant Σ: 1987–1988
Sigma: 1988–1990

== Mitsubishi Diamante based ==
A six-window, pillared sedan version of the first generation of the Mitsubishi Diamante hardtop sedan was sold in Japan and Europe as the Mitsubishi Sigma between 1991 and 1996. In Europe, the Australian-built station wagon derivative was also sold under the Sigma name. The Sigma also formed the basis of the Australian-made Mitsubishi Magna (second generation).

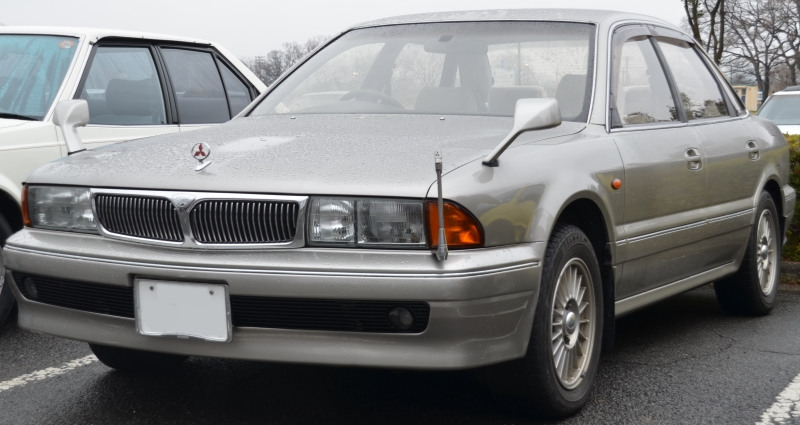
1991–1996
