= Subaru Leone =

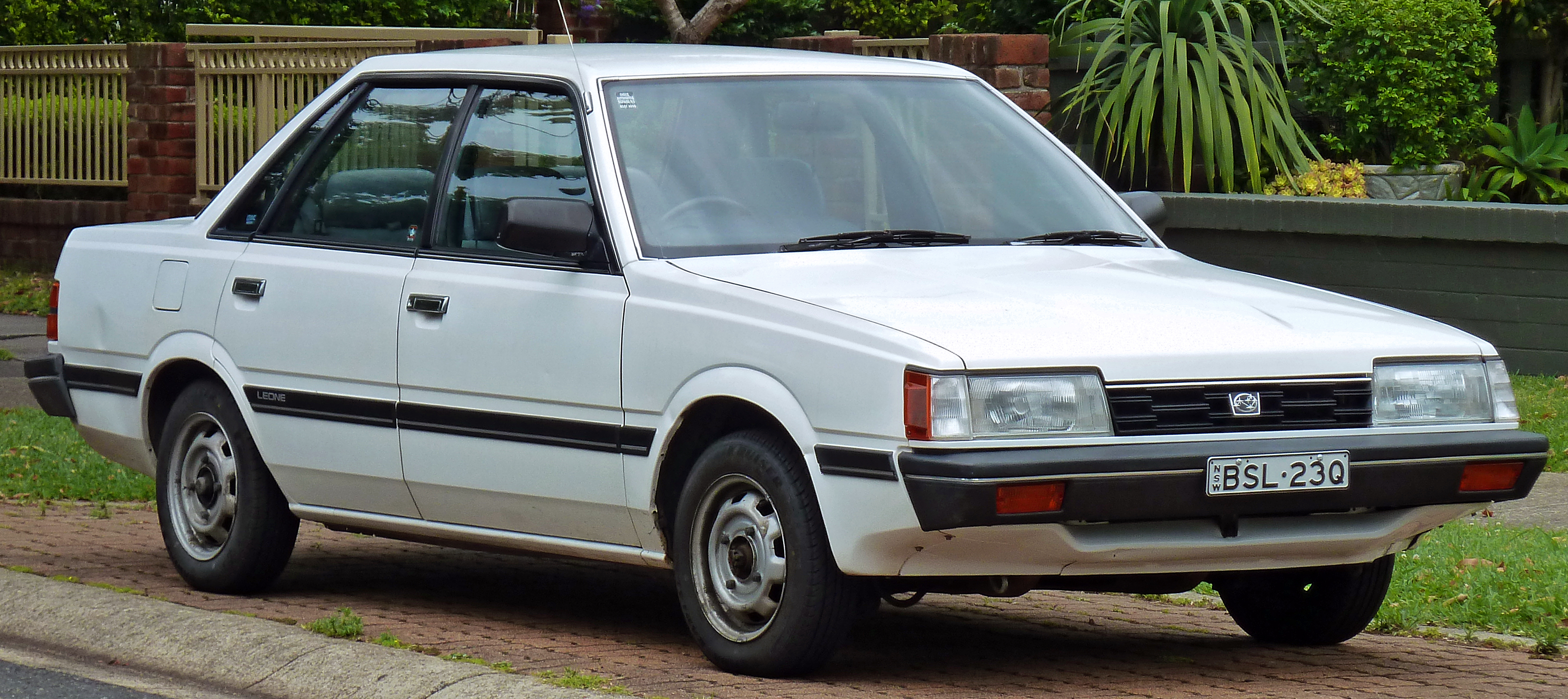

Overview
- Manufacturer: Subaru (Fuji Heavy Industries)
- Production: 1971–1994
- Assembly: Yajima Plant, Ōta, Gunma, Japan; Waitara, New Zealand

Body and chassis
- Class: Compact

Chronology
- Predecessor: Subaru 1000
- Successor: Subaru Impreza

The Subaru Leone is a compact car produced by the Japanese car manufacturer Subaru from 1971 to 1994. The word leone is Italian for lion.

It was released as a replacement for the Subaru 1000 and was the predecessor of the Subaru Impreza. All Leones were powered by the Subaru EA boxer engine. Most cars were equipped with optional four-wheel drive. At the time of its introduction, the Leone was Subaru's top model until 1989, when the larger Legacy was introduced.

Although released in Japan and some export markets as the Leone, for many years, this was the only vehicle sold internationally by Subaru where Subaru's smaller kei cars were not commonly sold. As a result, in major markets such as Australia, Europe and North America, it was instead identified with a trim level designation, some of which included: DL, GL, GLF, GLF5, GL-10, and RX. The car is thus often referred to simply as the Subaru GL or the Subaru L series.

In Israel, due to the Arab league boycott, Subaru was the only Japanese car sold between 1973 and 1991, when import of other Japanese brands resumed. As a result, the Subaru Leone held about 30% of the entire local passenger car market in those years, totalling approximately 220,000-250,000 units sold.

== First generation (A21/22/62/64/65) ==
Type A21/22/62/64/65
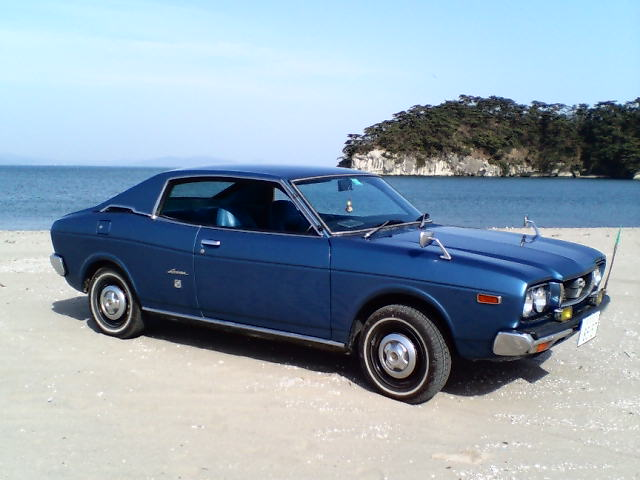
- Subaru Leone hardtop

Overview
- Also called: Subaru 1400; Subaru 1600
- Production: 1971–1981

Body and chassis
- Body style: 2-door coupé; 2-door hardtop; 2/4-door sedan; 5-door station wagon; 2-door pickup truck (BRAT/Brumby)
- Layout: front-wheel drive all-wheel drive optional

Powertrain
- Engine: 1.1 L EA61 OHV H4 (A21/61, van only); 1.2 L EA64 OHV H4 (A25/65); 1.4 L EA63 OHV H4 (A22/32/62); 1.6 L EA71 OHV H4 (A33/34/67)
- Transmission: 4/5-speed manual 3-speed automatic

Dimensions
- Wheelbase: 2,455 mm (96.7 in)
- Length: 3,995 mm (157.3 in)
- Width: 1,500 mm (59.1 in)
- Height: 1,385 mm (54.5 in)
- Curb weight: 775 kg (1,709 lb)

Chronology
- Predecessor: Subaru FF-1

The first generation Leone was released on October 7, 1971, as a front-wheel drive coupé, with trim levels DL, GL and GSR. April 1972 saw the introduction of the two- and four-door sedans with trim levels DL, GL, and in Japan, the Super Touring. At its introduction, the Leone was Subaru's largest car, and was the top level vehicle above the kei car Subaru Rex.

In September 1972, the four-wheel drive (4WD) station wagon (A67) was released, however it did not appear in the United States until 1974 as a 1975 model. The Leone was introduced before the 1972 Winter Olympics in Sapporo to emphasize its durability in adverse weather conditions. Up until this time four-wheel drive had been limited mainly to off-road vehicles, although the very expensive Jensen FF had been built in limited numbers.

Subaru broke this pattern by introducing a mass-produced four-wheel drive passenger car, after having tested the waters by building a limited series of four-wheel drive FF-1 1300G wagons in 1971. Four-wheel drive was Subaru's most notable feature during the 1970s and 1980s, leading to particularly strong sales in places like Switzerland and Colorado. The Leone competed with the Toyota Corolla, Nissan Sunny, Honda Civic, Mazda Familia, Isuzu Gemini, and the Mitsubishi Lancer. The Leone introduced a Subaru tradition of frameless side windows for all models.

In August 1968, Subaru entered into an alliance with Nissan Motors. The appearance of the new Leone was influenced by the design efforts from Nissan, especially the long hood and short trunk appearance that Nissan was using at that time for their own products. The 1400 RX coupé, based on the previously introduced GSR, was one of the first Japanese automobiles to be equipped with four-wheel disc brakes, a sport-tuned suspension and a 5-speed manual transmission. A two-door hardtop coupé, with different bodywork than the two-door sedan or two-door coupé, was introduced in June 1973. The hardtop coupé received model names containing the letter F for "Formal" (FL, GF, GFT). A 4WD version with the sedan bodywork (model code A27) appeared in 1975. In the Japanese market, the sedan had to be equipped with the SEEC-T desmogged EA71 engine producing 80 PS (59 kW), whereas the station wagon was classified as a commercial vehicle and thus received a 85 PS (63 kW) version of the same engine.

The Leone was originally equipped with a 1.2- or a 1.4-litre flat-four, carbureted, OHV engine. The 1,100 cc engine from the earlier FF-1 G was carried over for the Leone 1100 van in the Japanese domestic market, but was only available in the first few years. In September 1975, as a response to tightening emissions regulations, the 1.2 was removed from the sedan lineup (although it continued to be available as a van-wagon version in the Japanese domestic market). To be able to offer as much power as the pre-smog 1.4 a bigger, 1.6-litre version was added for 1976. In Europe, the 1.6 arrived during 1977. Fitted with twin, Hitachi register carburetors the European-spec engine produces a claimed 83 PS DIN (61 kW) at 5,600 rpm, with maximum torque of 113 N⋅m (83 lb⋅ft) at 3,600 rpm.

The Leone was available with a four-speed manual transmission, a five-speed manual transmission, and also a three-speed automatic transmission beginning in 1975. Some early models had duo-servo drum brakes at the front, however, later models were equipped with disc brakes. All models originally had rear drum brakes except the RX coupés. Unusually, the handbrake or emergency brake operated on the front wheels.

In March 1977, an updated Leone range was released. All body panels were altered slightly and the overall look was 'smoother' and more contemporary in appearance. A completely new dashboard with altered interior were also part of the update. Despite these changes the overall effect was similar to the earlier version and it was mechanically identical, with the exception of the rear track which was widened by 40 mm (1.6 in). The chassis codes were changed, with sedans now in the 30 series and estates in the 60 series. The little 1.2 continued to be available in the lowliest standard van model, with 68 PS (50 kW). In November 1977, a new top model arrived, the Leone Grand Am-T, which adopted the federalized safety bumpers and had an interior "inspired by American tastes."

The Leone entered Australia and New Zealand in 1973, with cars imported fully assembled from Japan. The 4WD Wagon entered the Australian market in 1975, and remained the only vehicle in its class until the early 1980s. Many versions - sedan, wagon and Brumby (BRAT) coupe utility, were also assembled from CKD kits, from 1978, in New Zealand by then-importer Motor Holdings' Waitara plant near New Plymouth. Local assembly ceased when the Legacy range replaced the Leone in 1993.

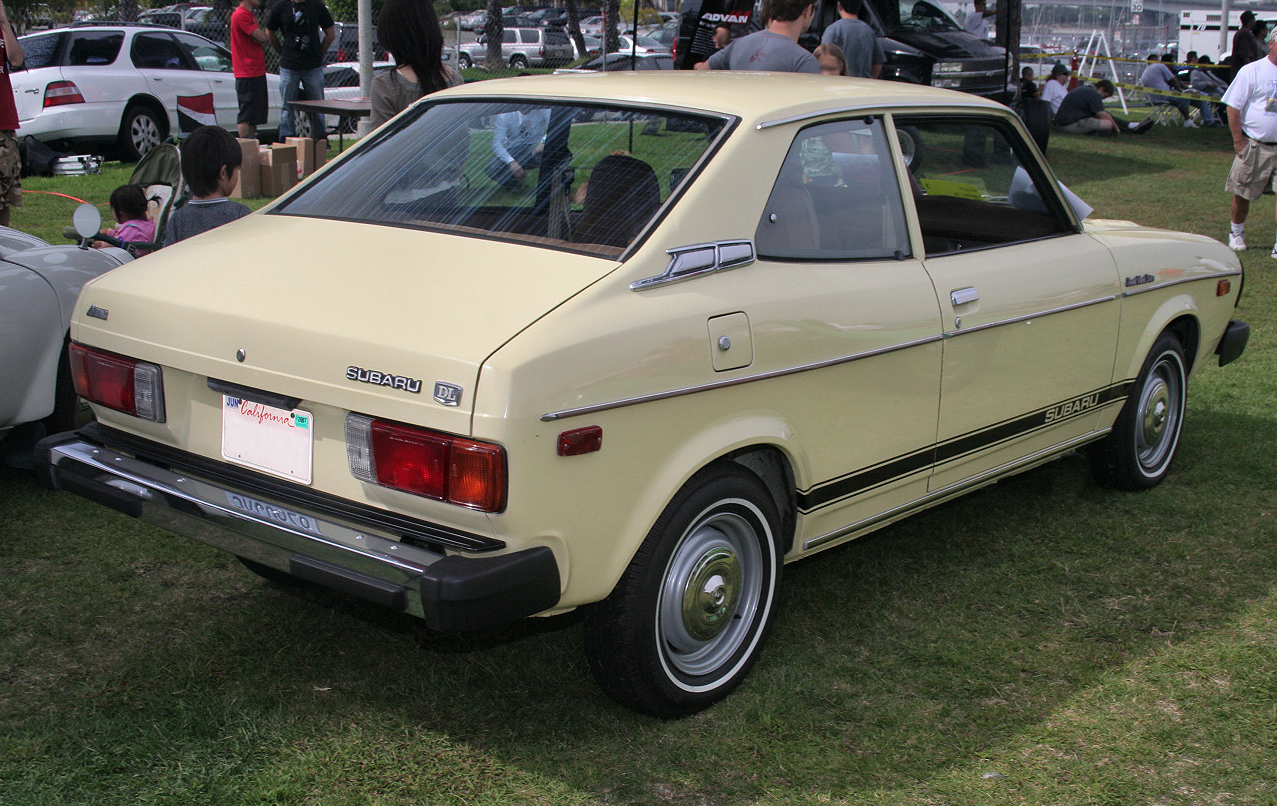
1978 Subaru DL 2-door sedan

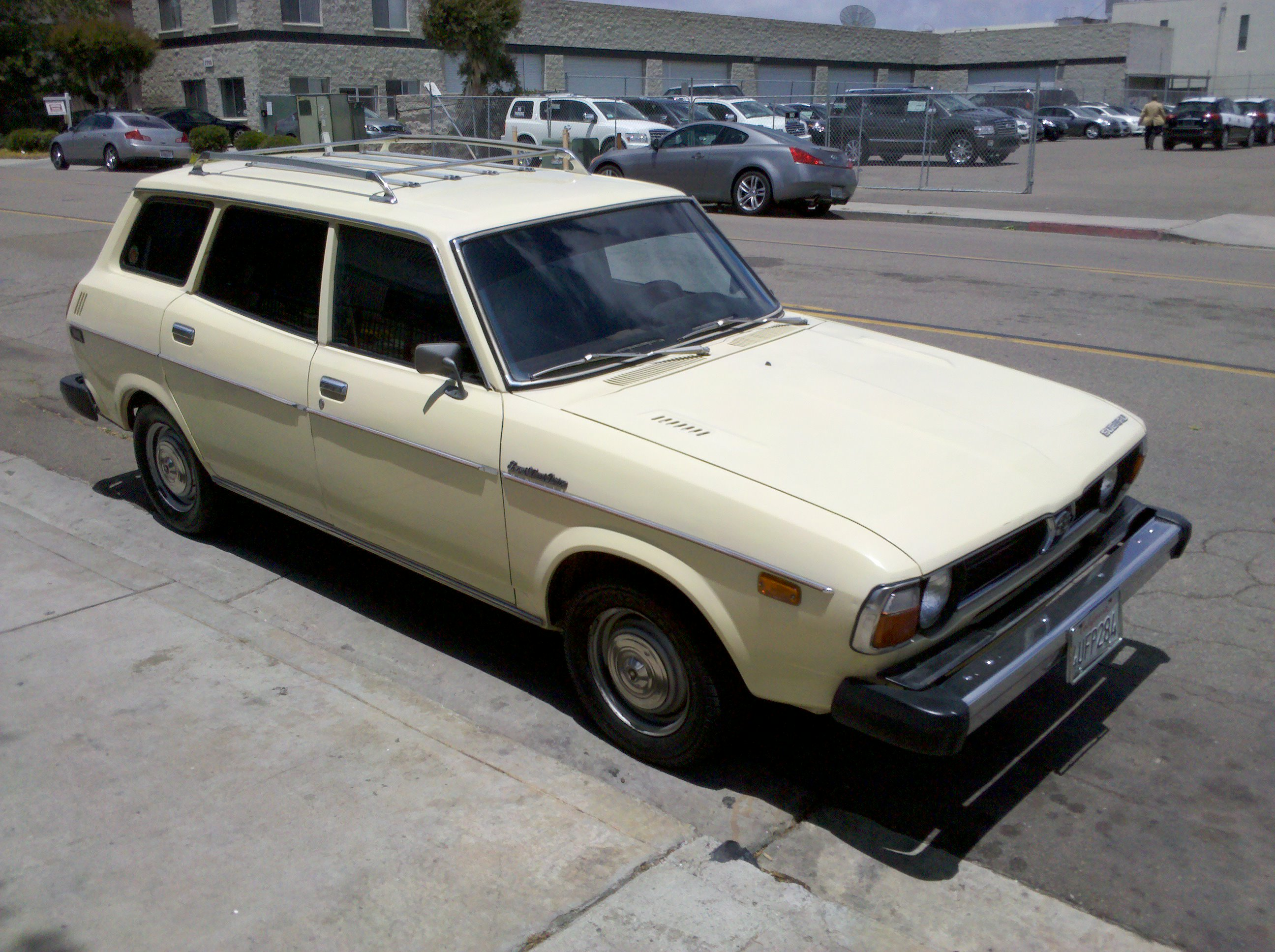
1978 Subaru DL wagon

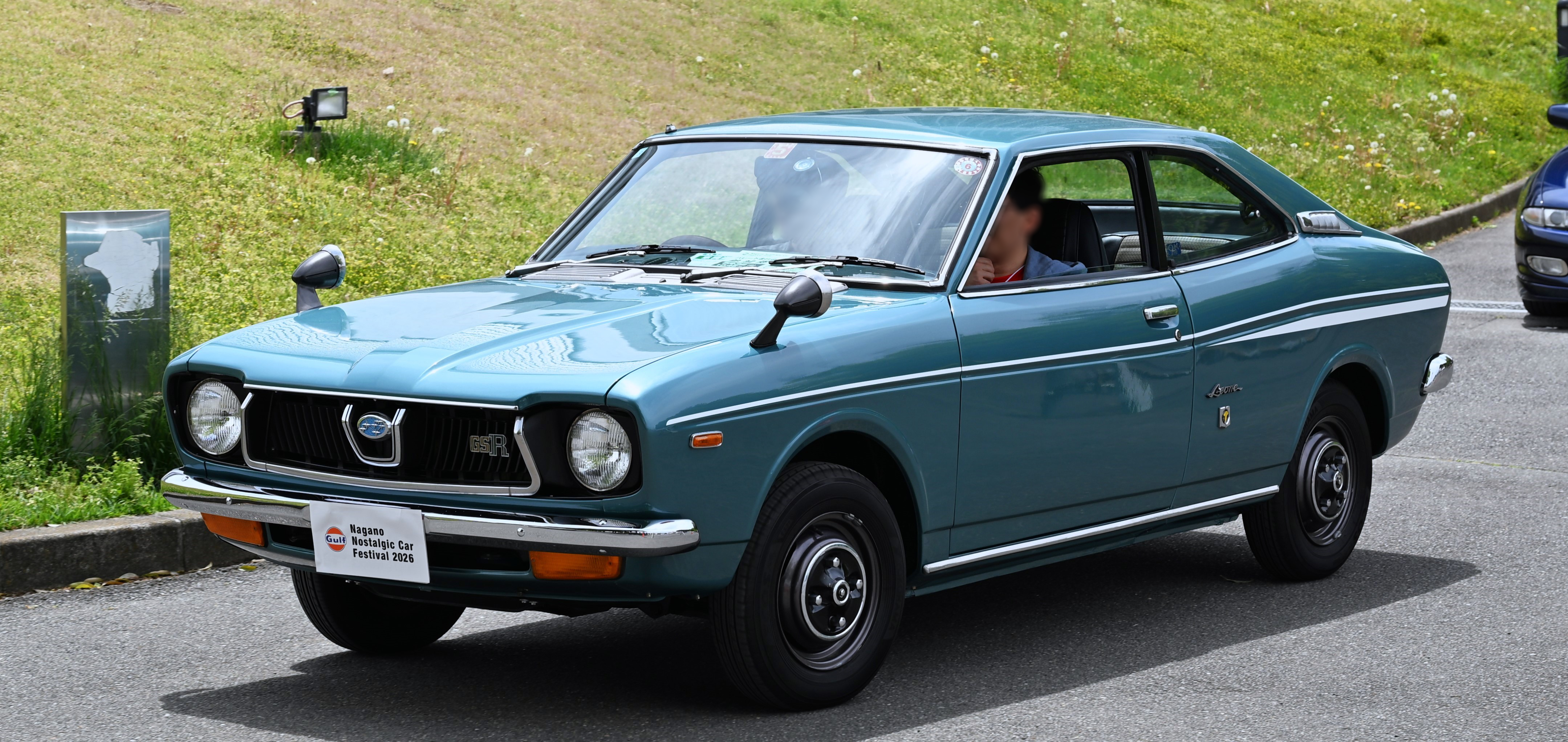
1971-1973 Subaru Leone GSR Coupé

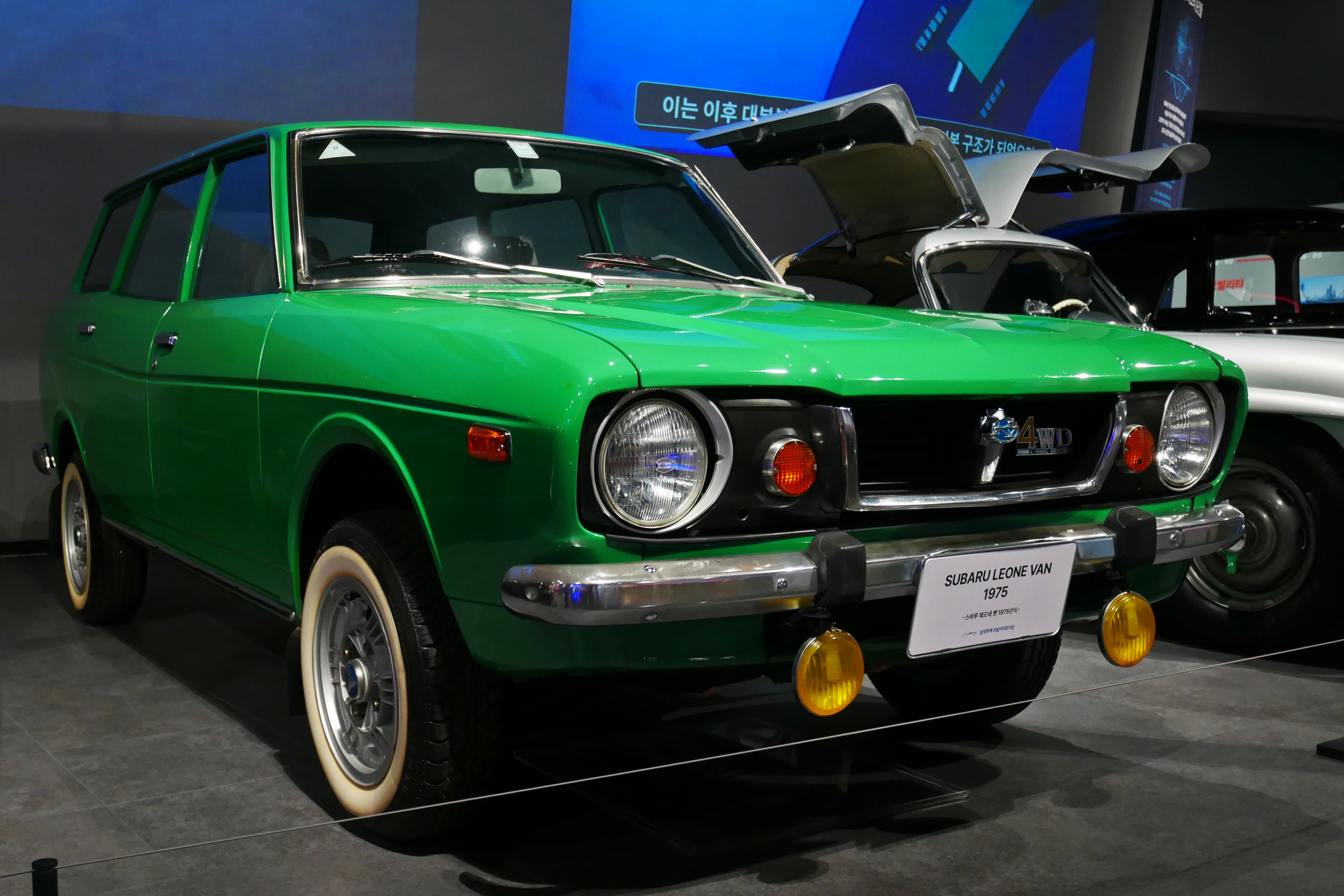
1975 Subaru Leone Van

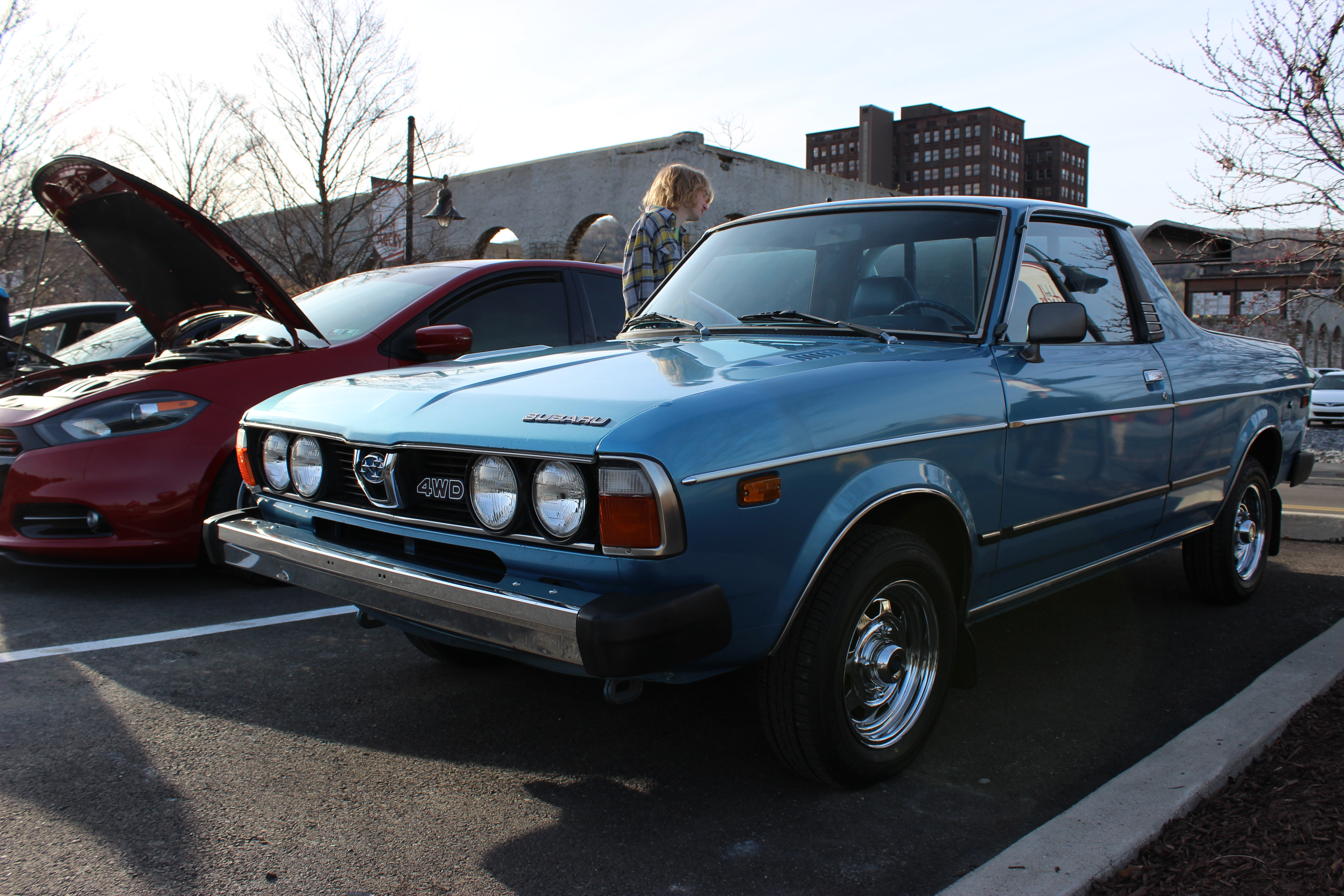
1978 Subaru BRAT

=== North America ===
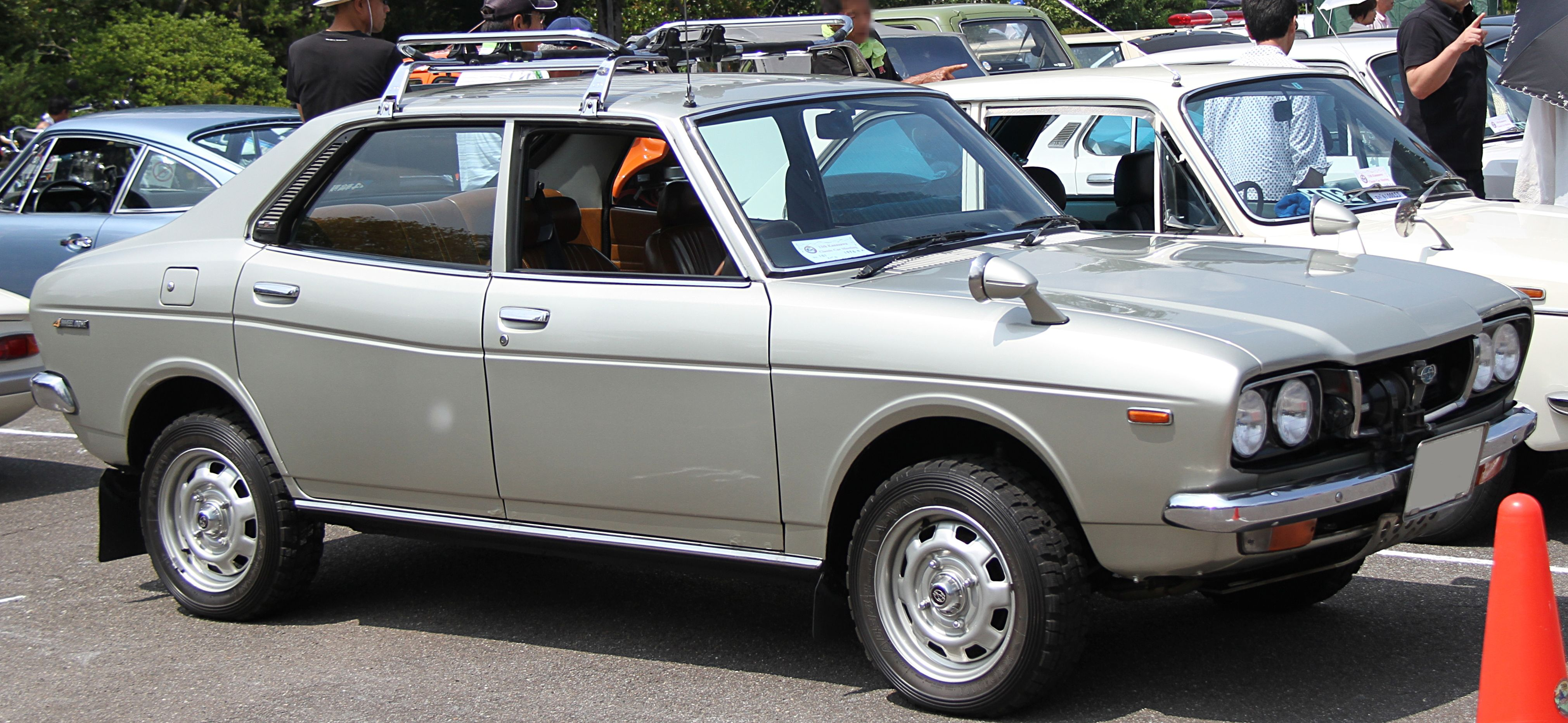
1976 Subaru Leone 4WD sedan

The Leone was first introduced to the United States in 1972. In 1976 the EA63 engine was replaced with the 1.6 liter EA71 engine. The EA71 engine was originally installed in cars equipped with automatic transmission but eventually supplanted the EA63 across the entire range of vehicles in the US and Australia. Using Subaru's new SEEC-T technology meant that a catalytic converter was not necessary, lowering cost and enabling the use of leaded fuel. Power in 49-state (US) trim was 67 hp (50 kW) at 5200 rpm (two horsepower less in California), although drivability and gas mileage suffered distinctly from the emissions equipment. The Wagon was also available with four-wheel drive, beginning with the 1977 model year.

A print ad for the 1973 Subaru GL coupé referred to the engine as "quadrozontal". The large bumpers required in the United States sat on hydraulic units; these were not a part of the original design and thus intruded considerably into the luggage compartment.

Late 1977 saw the introduction of the Subaru BRAT as a 1978 model. This was a two-seater body with a pickup truck bed, with two seats welded into the bed to evade the so-called chicken tax on light commercial vehicles. It brought the U.S. lineup to eight models in three trim levels. Most were in the volume DL trim except a base two-door, and the GF hardtop and 4WD models which shared a higher specification. For 1979, a decontented DL 4WD wagon and BRAT were added along with fancier GL four-door sedan and 2WD wagon models bringing the total to twelve, the original fully equipped 4WDs also getting the DL designation. The original BRAT was updated for 1981 with a dual-range 4WD transmission and the 1.8-litre EA81 engine. This was sold alongside the second-generation Leone (introduced in 1979) until the 1982 model year.

== Second generation (AB/AM/AF/AJ) ==
Type AB2/4/AM2/AF5/AJ5

Overview
- Production: 1979–1984; 1979–1989 (Hatchback); 1981–1994 (BRAT)

Body and chassis
- Body style: 2-door coupé 4-door sedan 5-door station wagon 2-door coupe utility (pickup) (BRAT); 3-door hatchback
- Layout: front-wheel drive four-wheel drive optional

Powertrain
- Engine: 1.3 L EA65 OHV H4; 1.6 L EA71 OHV H4; 1.8 L EA81 OHV H4; 1.8 L EA81 turbo OHV H4
- Transmission: 4/5-speed manual 3-speed automatic

Dimensions
- Wheelbase: 2,445 mm (96.3 in)
- Length: 4,285 mm (168.7 in)
- Width: 1,620 mm (63.8 in)
- Height: 1,415 mm (55.7 in)
- Curb weight: 1,091 kg (2,405 lb)

In June 1979 the Leone saw its first complete model update. This generation was released with a two-door hardtop coupé, four-door sedan, station wagon and a three-door hatchback. Export sales began in the fall with the 1980 model year. The earlier two-door sedan was replaced by a three-door hatchback design ("Swingback" in Japan), as an alternative to contemporary hatchback competitors. The Swingback, however, differed from its competitors in offering the option of four-wheel-drive.

New for this generation was a dual-range four-speed 4WD transmission with both hi/lo range gearing and manual ride height adjustment on the 4WD models. In November 1981 Subaru introduced Japan's first all-wheel-drive vehicle with an automatic transmission, utilizing the world's first "wet hydraulic multi-plate clutch". This allowed the driver to engage 4WD with a simple push of a button rather than shifting a lever as in the manual models. The electric switch activated a solenoid that pushed the clutch plates together, thereby engaging the driveshaft to the rear wheels.

A new 1.8 L EA81 engine was added to the lineup from the beginning. In November 1983, a turbocharger with optional multi-port fuel injection was also added to the BRAT and Turbo Wagon models. They were only available with an automatic transmission and 3.70:1 gearing. In Japan the top-spec 1800 GTS sedan was the first Subaru to offer air conditioning, power windows, and power steering. The installation of a turbocharger was to provide better fuel economy by reducing emissions and burning fuel more effectively as opposed to providing a performance oriented product, due to taxes levied by the Japanese Government on a graduated scale based on emissions emitted.

=== Export markets ===
This generation of hatchback and BRAT were made alongside the third-generation offerings until 1987 for the BRAT in the United States (1993 in some markets and 1994 in Latin America) and 1989 for the hatchback. All other second generation models were discontinued by 1985.

United States

In the United States, the trim level of a vehicle could be identified by the headlights – early GLs had square while others had round; later GLs had quad square headlights and lower series had single squares, with 1982 being a transition year (2WD GL=quad square, 4WD GL=single square with third light, all DLs=single square, STD hatchback=single round). 1980–1982 models also featured an optional third headlight hidden behind the grille logo, using a similar approach used by Chrysler in the late 1960s called the Super-Lite. The logo moved up and out of the way when the driver activated a switch on the dash, revealing the extra headlight and activating it when the high-beams were illuminated.

Australia

Australian buyers originally only received the option of a 50 kW (68 PS; 67 hp) 1.6-liter engine coupled with a four-speed manual transmission. It was available as a four-door sedan or as a 4WD wagon.

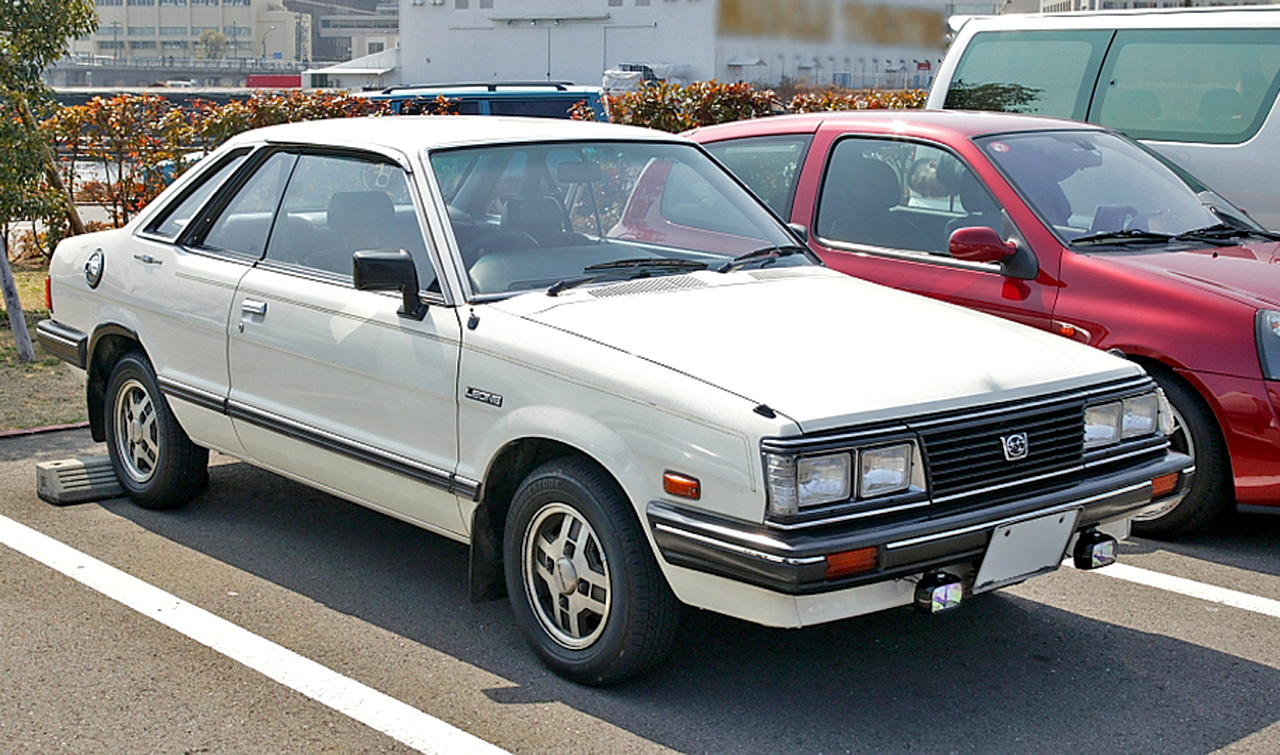
1979 Subaru Leone hardtop coupé

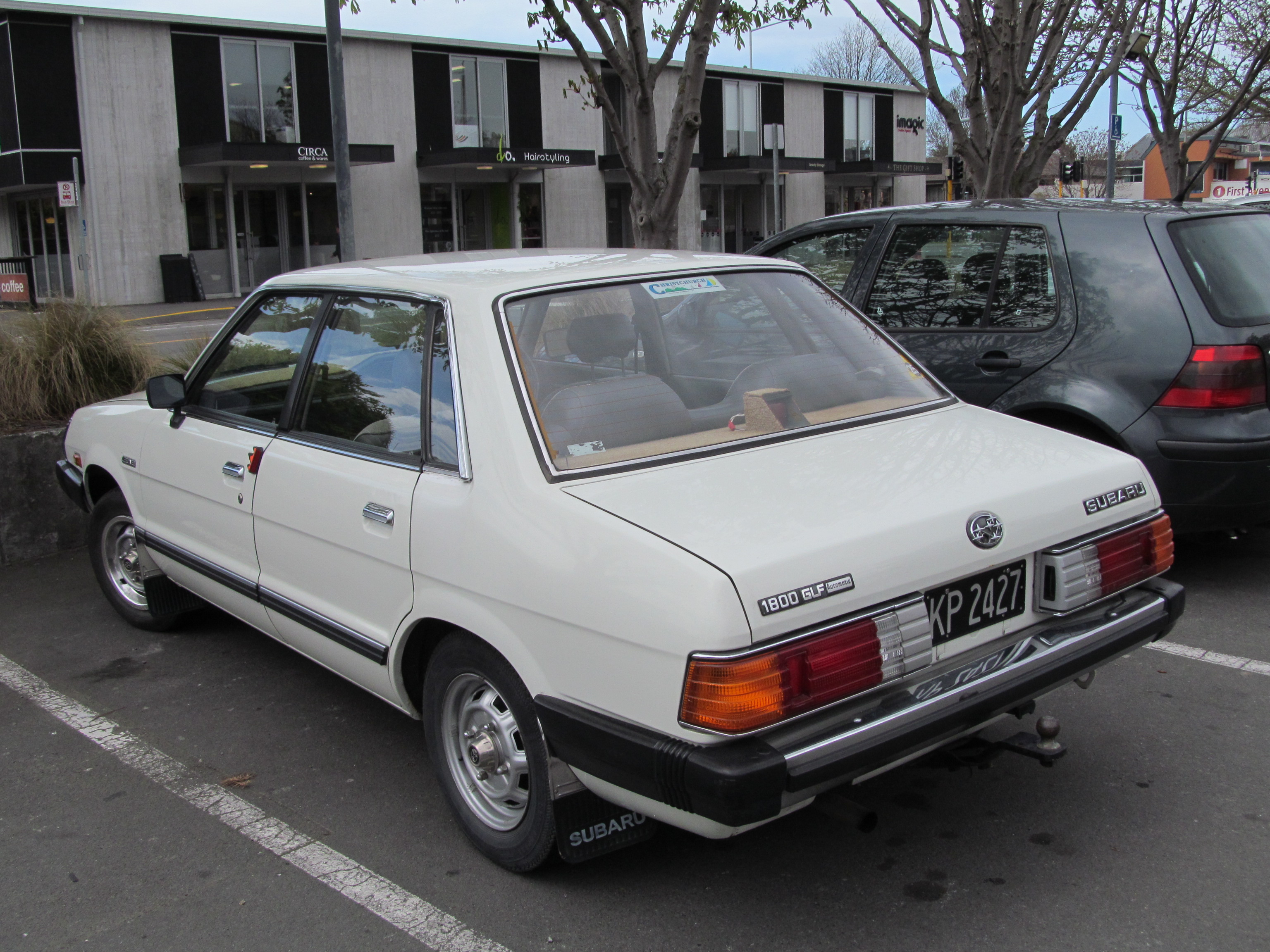
1982 Subaru Leone sedan

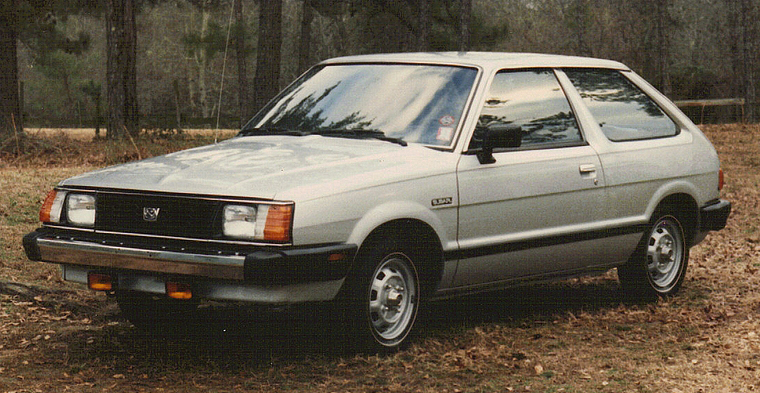
1984 Subaru DL hatchback

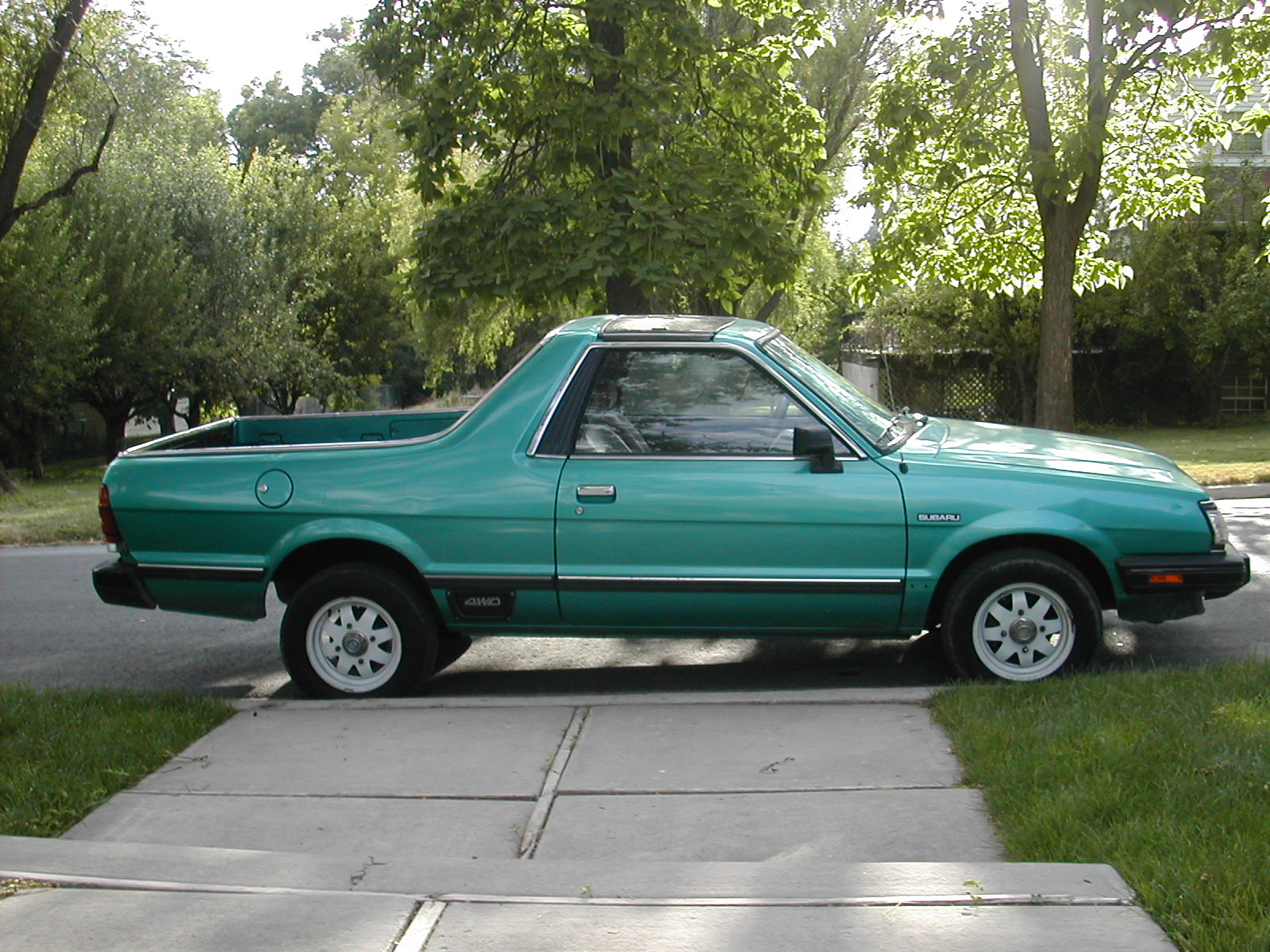
1985 Subaru BRAT

== Third generation (AA/AL/AG) ==
Type AA2/3/4/5/AL3/5/7/AG4/5/6
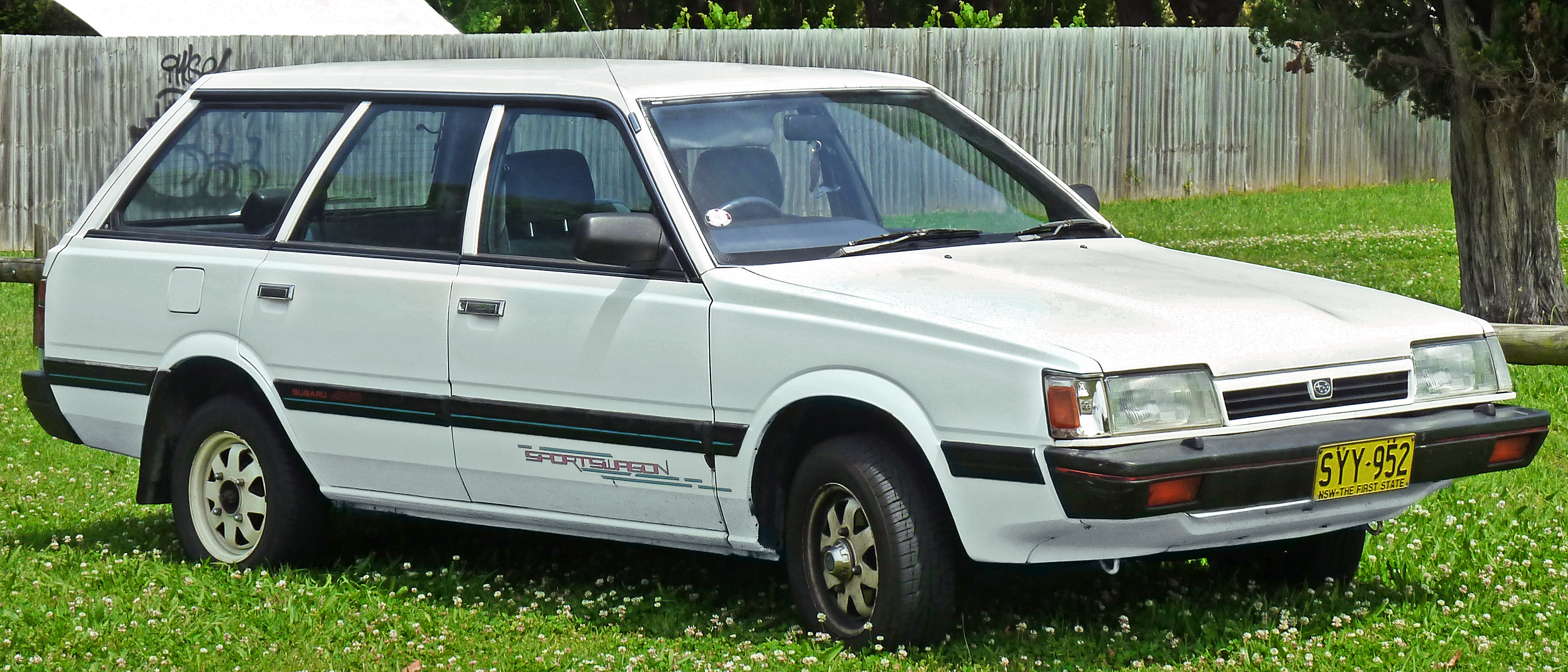

Overview
- Also called: Subaru DL/GL; Subaru Loyale; Subaru Omega; Subaru L series Subaru GL-10; Subaru RX; Subaru 1800; Isuzu Geminett II
- Production: 1984–1994

Body and chassis
- Body style: 3-door liftback coupé 4-door sedan 5-door station wagon
- Layout: Front-wheel drive 4WD on Demand; All-Wheel Drive (4WD Full Time)
- Related: Subaru XT

Powertrain
- Engine: 1.3 L EA65 OHV H4; 1.6 L EA71 OHV H4; 1.8 L EA82 SOHC H4; 1.8 L EA82T Turbo SOHC H4
- Transmission: 3-speed automatic 4-speed automatic 4-speed manual 5-speed manual 5-speed Dual Range manual with Differential Lock

Dimensions
- Wheelbase: 2,470 mm (97.2 in) (sedan)
- Length: 4,435 mm (174.6 in) (sedan)
- Width: 1,660 mm (65.4 in)
- Height: 1,335 mm (52.6 in) (2WD sedan)
- Curb weight: 1,060 kg (2,340 lb) (RX)

Chronology
- Successor: Subaru Impreza

On July 16, 1984, the Leone saw its second major redesign utilizing what was called "folded paper" appearance. This generation was released with a three-door hatchback, four-door sedan and a continuation of the popular station wagon body style. This generation Leone made its way to the United States in 1985. The liftback coupé was hamstrung by a very high rear cargo lip, but did receive a split folding rear seat.

In Europe, the range was 1.3 DL, 1.6 DL, 1.6 GL, 1.8 DL, and 1.8 GL 4WD. There were also Turbo versions, with 120 PS (88 kW) in catalyzed specifications. Not all versions were offered in all countries.

In North America, the 1.6-liter engine was dropped completely from the lineup, due to its lack of power. The 65 PS (48 kW) 1.3 was only available in select markets. For 1987, the Leone received a facelift with a smoothed out appearance.

A new 1.8-liter SOHC engine, EA82 was offered instead of the OHV 1.8-liter flat-four engine. The engine was available with a carburetor, single point fuel injection, multi-port fuel injection, or multi-port fuel injection with a turbocharger.

From 1988 this generation saw the availability of a full-time 4WD manual transmission or a full-time 4WD four-speed electronically controlled automatic transmission.

Other options found in the third generation Leone were a full digital instrument panel; self diagnostic computer, travel computer, cruise control and pneumatic suspension with selectable height,(previous generations 4WD models had manual height adjustment).

The performance oriented RX sedan was introduced in 1985, reusing a trim package designation first introduced in December 1972. It was equipped with the EA82T turbo engine mated to a five speed manual transmission with synchronized dual-range and a manually-locking center differential. It had a 3.70:1 rear Limited Slip Differential, rally tuned suspension, four wheel disc brakes, power windows, A/C, central locking differential, adjustable seats and steering wheel, split fold-down rear seats, and hill holder. Weight was 1,070 kg (2,359 lb). The RX coupe was introduced in 1987, and the automatic transmission version was introduced in 1989, its final year of production. Only 2,600 coupes were made; 1,500 sedans were sold in the first year. The RX (short for "Rally-X", with the X indicating the unknown element in rallying) is the predecessor of the Subaru WRX.

From September 1988 until July 1993, the van version was also provided to Isuzu as the "Geminett II" under an OEM deal.

By 1990 the Leone name continued to be used in Japan but was now known as the Loyale in Chile, the United States and Canada; the L-Series in Europe and Australia, and as the Omega in New Zealand where the third generation was the last to be assembled locally by Motor Holdings at Waitara. The popularity of the Leone wagon was ceded to the new, larger, Legacy wagon in 1989 and was ultimately replaced by the Impreza in 1994. The Impreza was introduced with a 'hatch like' wagon which was reminiscent of the first and second generation Leone wagons.

There were no third generation BRAT/Brumby/MV pickup as the range was discontinued after 1987. There was however a concept for a Subaru Suiren and the next generation Subaru Baja.

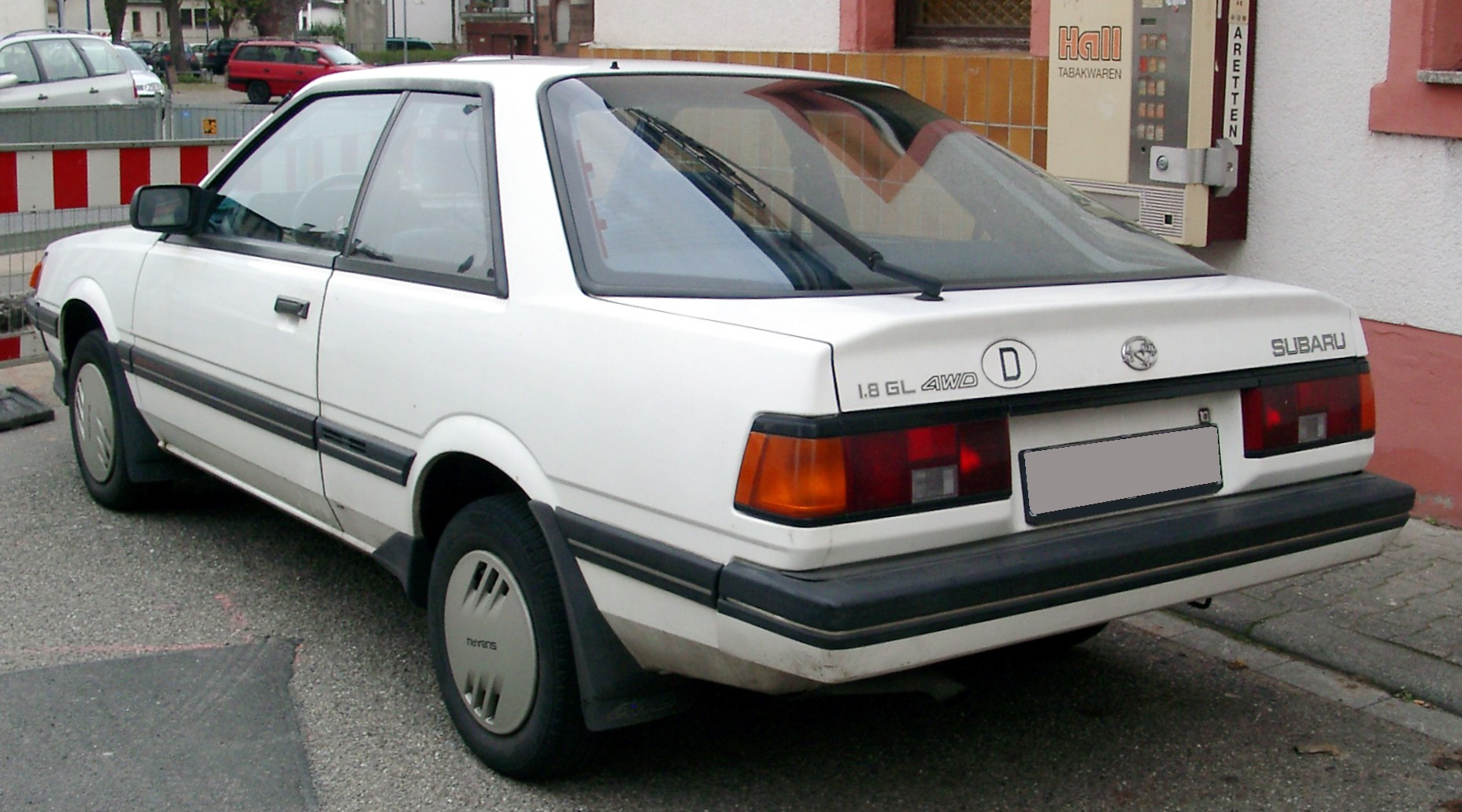
Subaru 1.8 GL 4WD coupé

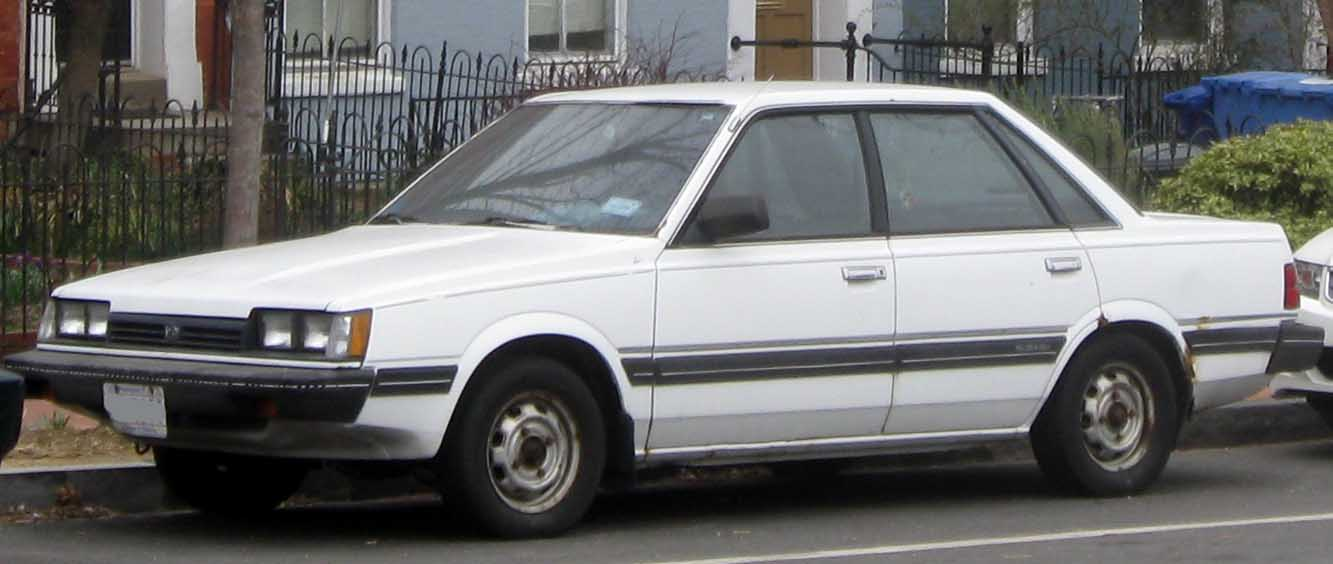
Subaru DL Sedan

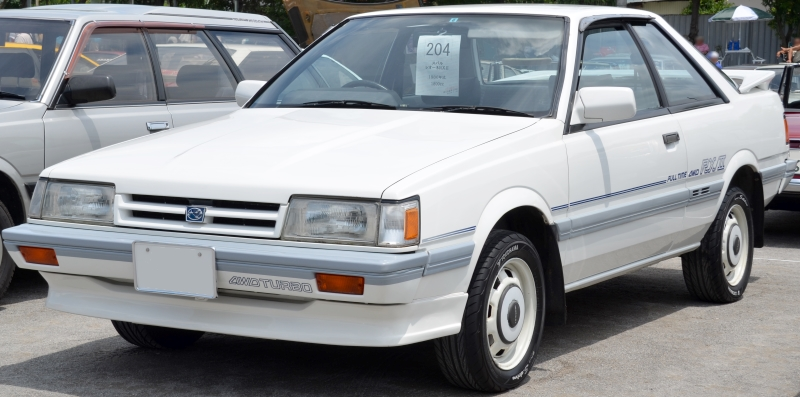
Subaru RX/II coupé

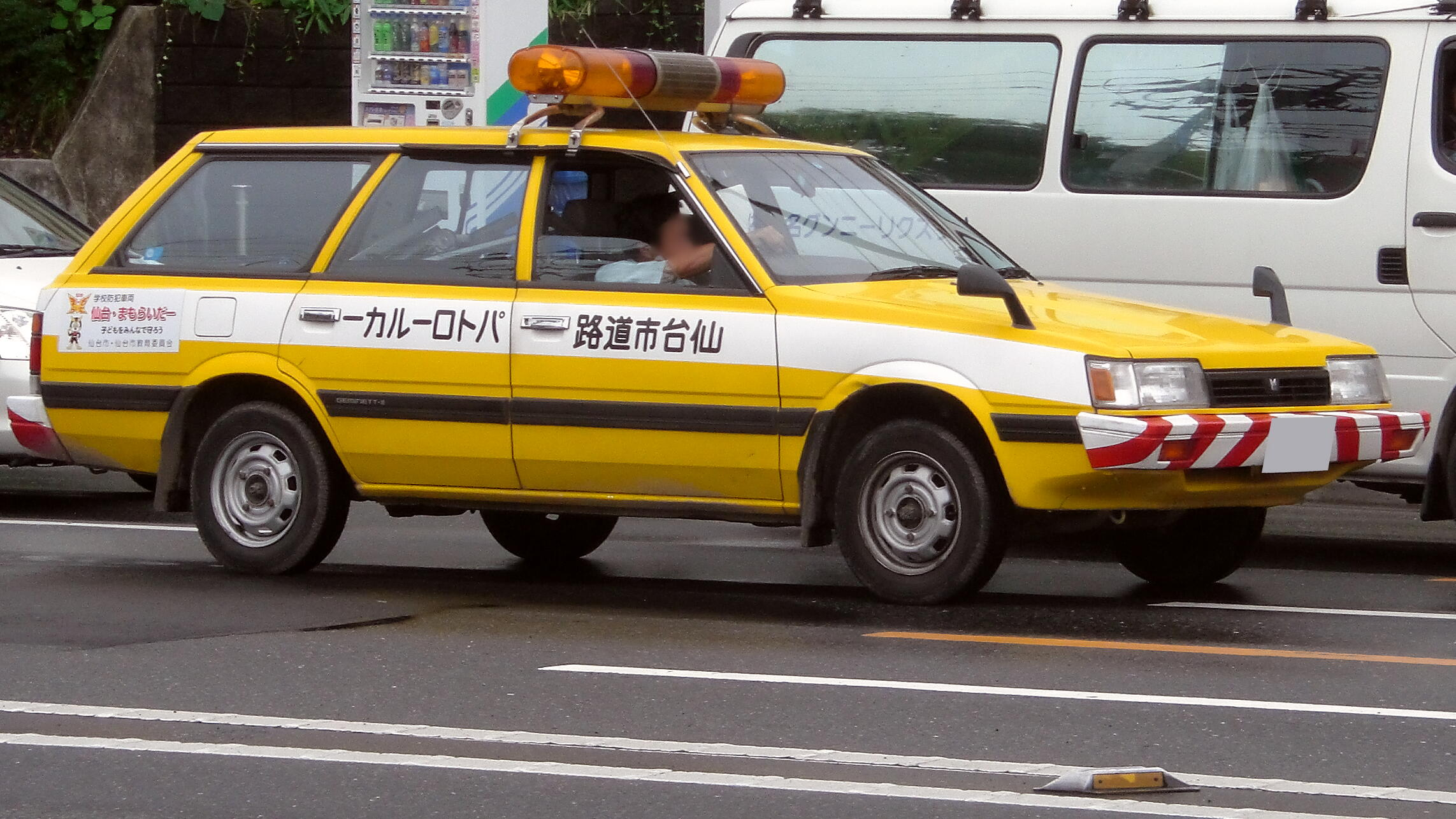
Isuzu Geminett II

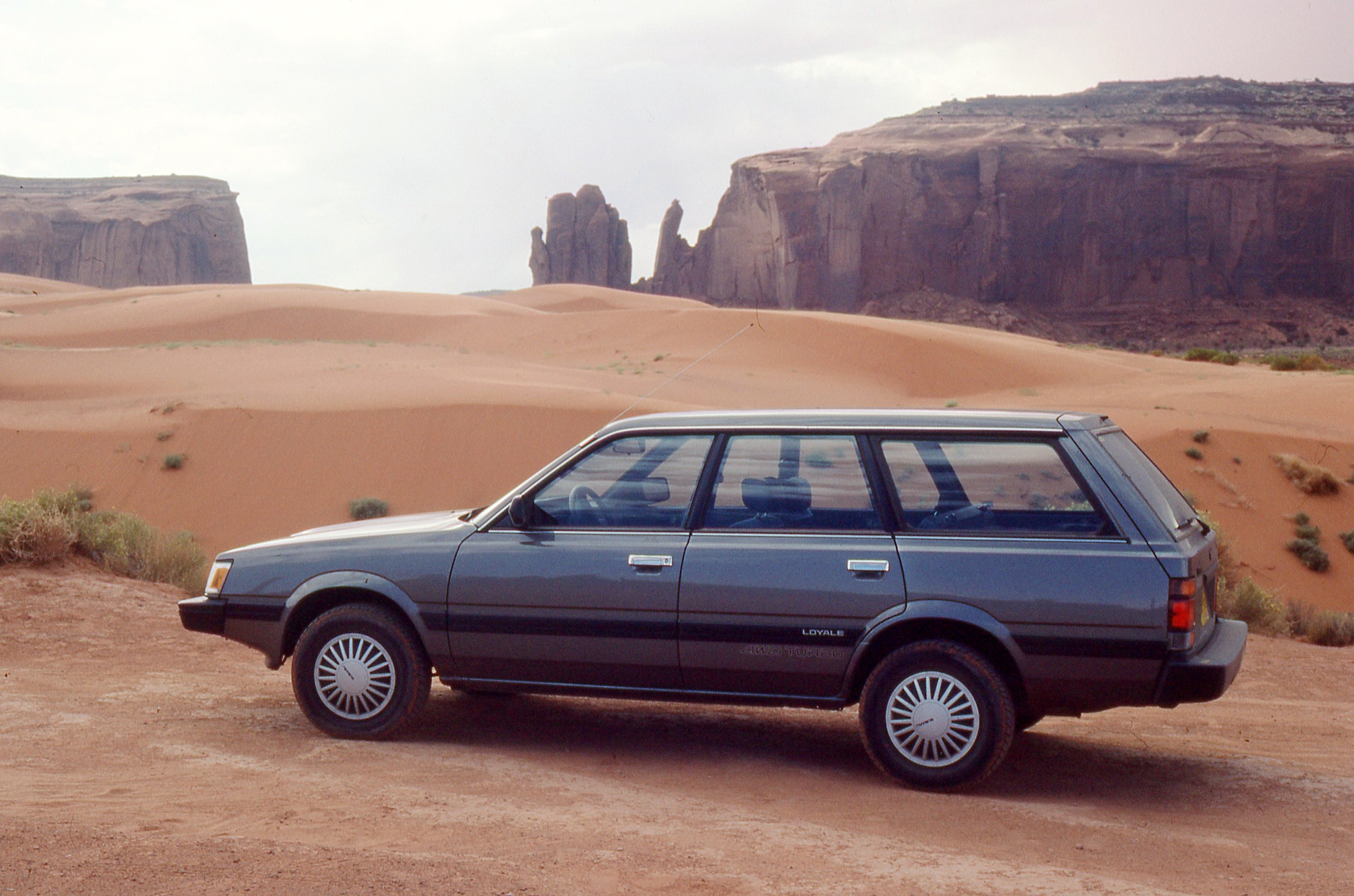
1989 Subaru Loyale Turbo 4WD wagon

== Motorsport ==
Mike Kirkland's Subaru Leone RX Turbo at the 1986 Safari Rally

=== World Rally Championship ===
Subaru Rally Team Japan led by Noriyuki Koseki (founder of Subaru Tecnica International STI) ran Subaru Leone coupé, sedan DL and RX Turbo in the World Rally Championship between 1980 and 1989 a few rallies per season. Drivers for individual rallies included Ari Vatanen, Per Eklund, Shekhar Mehta, Mike Kirkland, Possum Bourne, Frank Tundo, Harald Demut and Chilean driver Jose Antonio Celsi. Mike Kirkland finished 6th overall and won the A Group at the 1986 Safari Rally. That year Subaru was one of the only manufacturers combining 4WD and turbo. Jose Antonio Celsi finished eight in the 1986 Marlboro Rally Argentina and fifth in the 1988 Marlboro Rally Argentina. During 1989 Subaru entry two works RX Turbo for Jose Antonio Celsi and Possum Bourne. Celsi finished fourth, but retired on the final road section and Bourne retired during the first stage. Subaru changed the rally model to Legacy RS for the 1990–1992 period and took part in the first complete season in the World Rally Championship with the same model in 1993.

== Leone Delivery Van ==
Introduced in August 1994, the Subaru Leone Van was a badge engineered version of the Nissan AD van for light commercial uses. The Leone's successor Legacy and Impreza did not compete in this segment. It was sold in two generations until the 2001 model year. In March 2001, sales of the Leone Van ended. The Sambar, which had grown larger due to changes in mini vehicle standards, was beginning to compete with the Leone Van. The name of "Leone" ended after three decades. At the same time, it meant Subaru's withdrawal from the small truck market.
