= Mini =

British car model from 1959 to 2000

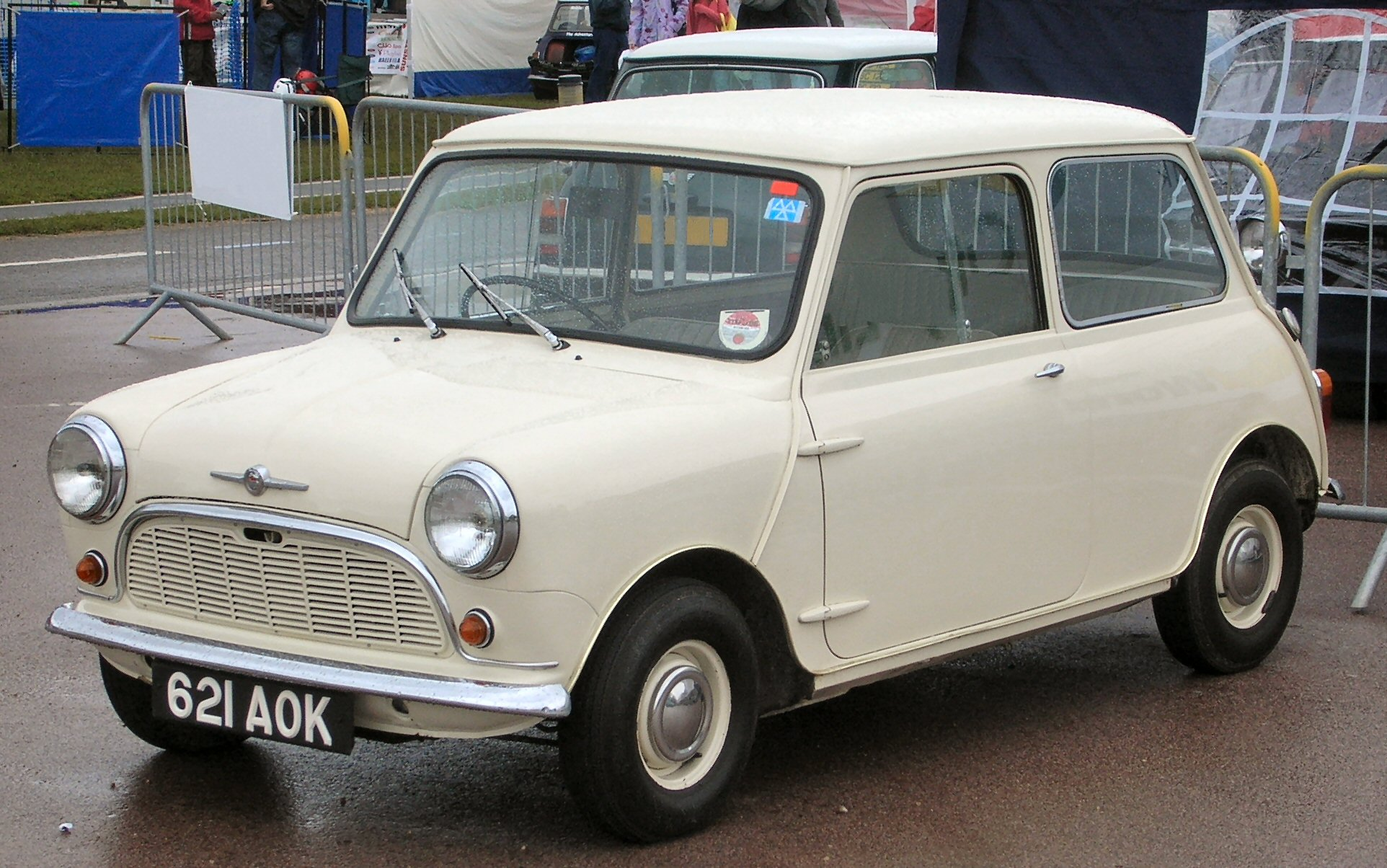
- 1959 BMC ADO15 (first one built)

Overview
- Manufacturer: United Kingdom: British Motor Corporation (1959–1968); British Leyland (1968–1986); Rover Group (1986–2000); International: Innocenti (1965–1975); Authi (1968–1975); Associated Motor Industries Malaysia; BMC Australia; Industrija Motornih Vozil; New Zealand Motor Corporation; BMC South Africa; Leyland South Africa; Leyland Australia; Thai Motor Corporation
- Also called: Austin 850; Rover Mini; Austin Cooper; Austin Mini; Austin Partner; Austin Seven; Innocenti Mini; Leyland Mini; Morris 850; Morris Mascot; Morris Mini Minor; Riley Elf; Wolseley 1000 (South Africa); Wolseley Hornet
- Production: 1959–2000 (5.38 million)
- Assembly: United Kingdom: Longbridge plant, Birmingham (1959–2000); South Africa: Cape Town (BMC/Leyland South Africa); Italy: Lambrate, Milan (Innocenti Mini); New Zealand: Panmure; New Zealand: Petone
- Designer: Sir Alec Issigonis; John Sheppard

Body and chassis
- Class: City car (A)
- Body style: 2-door saloon; 2-door convertible; 2-door estate; 2-door van; 2-door coupe utility
- Layout: FF layout
- Related: Mini Moke; Austin Metro; Innocenti Mini (1974–82); Mini Wildgoose; Midas Bronze; Mini Marcos

Powertrain
- Engine: 848 cc, 970 cc, 997 cc, 998 cc, 1,071 cc, 1,098 cc, 1,275 cc A-series I4
- Transmission: 4-speed manual; 4-speed automatic; 5-speed manual (optional extra on some later models)

Dimensions
- Wheelbase: 2,036 mm (80.2 in) (saloon); 2,138 mm (84.2 in) (estate and commercials)
- Length: 3,054 mm (120.2 in) (saloon); 3,299 mm (129.9 in) (estate and commercials); 3,300 mm (130 in) (Wolseley Hornet/Riley Elf)
- Width: 1,410 mm (56 in) up to 1,530 mm (60 in) with widest 'sportspack' factory wheel-arches
- Height: 1,346 mm (53.0 in)
- Kerb weight: 580–686 kg (1,279–1,512 lb)

Chronology
- Successor: Austin Metro; Mini Hatch

The Mini is a two-door, four-seat small car produced for four decades over a single generation, with many names and variants, by the British Motor Corporation (BMC) and its successors British Leyland and the Rover Group, and finally (briefly) under BMW ownership. Minis were built as saloons, estates, convertibles, and various other body styles. Minus a brief 1990s hiatus, from 1959 into 2000, an estimated 5.38 million of all variations combined were built.

Initially, the Mini was marketed under the Austin and Morris names, as the Austin Seven and Morris Mini-Minor; the Austin Seven was renamed Austin Mini in 1962 and Mini became a marque in its own right in 1969. (Note: In 1980, it was once again marketed as Austin Mini before reverting to just "Mini" in 1988, although the "Rover" badge was applied on some models exported to Japan.) Retrospectively, the car is known as the "Classic Mini" to distinguish it from the modern MINI family of vehicles produced since 2001 by German carmaker BMW, who took ownership of the Mini name following the sale of Rover Group in 2000.

This distinctive two-door car was designed for BMC by Sir Alec Issigonis. Its space-saving transverse engine, integrated sump transmission, front-wheel drive layout – allowing 80% of the area of the car's floorpan to be used for passengers and luggage – influenced a generation of car makers. The front-wheel-drive, transverse-engine layout were used in many other "supermini" style car designs such as Honda N360 (1967), Nissan Cherry (1970), and Fiat 127 (1971). The layout was also adapted for larger subcompact designs. In 1999, the Mini was voted the second-most influential car of the 20th century, behind the Ford Model T, and ahead of the Citroën DS and Volkswagen Beetle. It is also considered an icon of 1960s British popular culture.

The Mini Mark I had three major UK updates: the Mark II, the Clubman, and the Mark III. Within these was a series of variations, including an estate car, a pick-up, a van, and the Mini Moke, a jeep-like buggy. The performance versions, the Mini Cooper and Cooper "S", were successful as both race and rally cars, winning the Monte Carlo Rally in 1964, 1965, and 1967. The Mini was manufactured in England at the Longbridge plant in Birmingham located next to BMC's headquarters and at the former Morris Motors plant at Cowley, as well as in Australia (Victoria Park/Zetland BMC Australia factory) and later also in Spain (Authi), Belgium, Italy (Innocenti, as the Innocenti Mini), Chile, Malta, Portugal, South Africa, Uruguay, Venezuela, and Yugoslavia (IMV). In 1980, British Leyland launched the Mini's follow-up, the Austin Metro, however the Mini outlasted it and continued to be produced at Longbridge until October 2000.

== Design and development ==
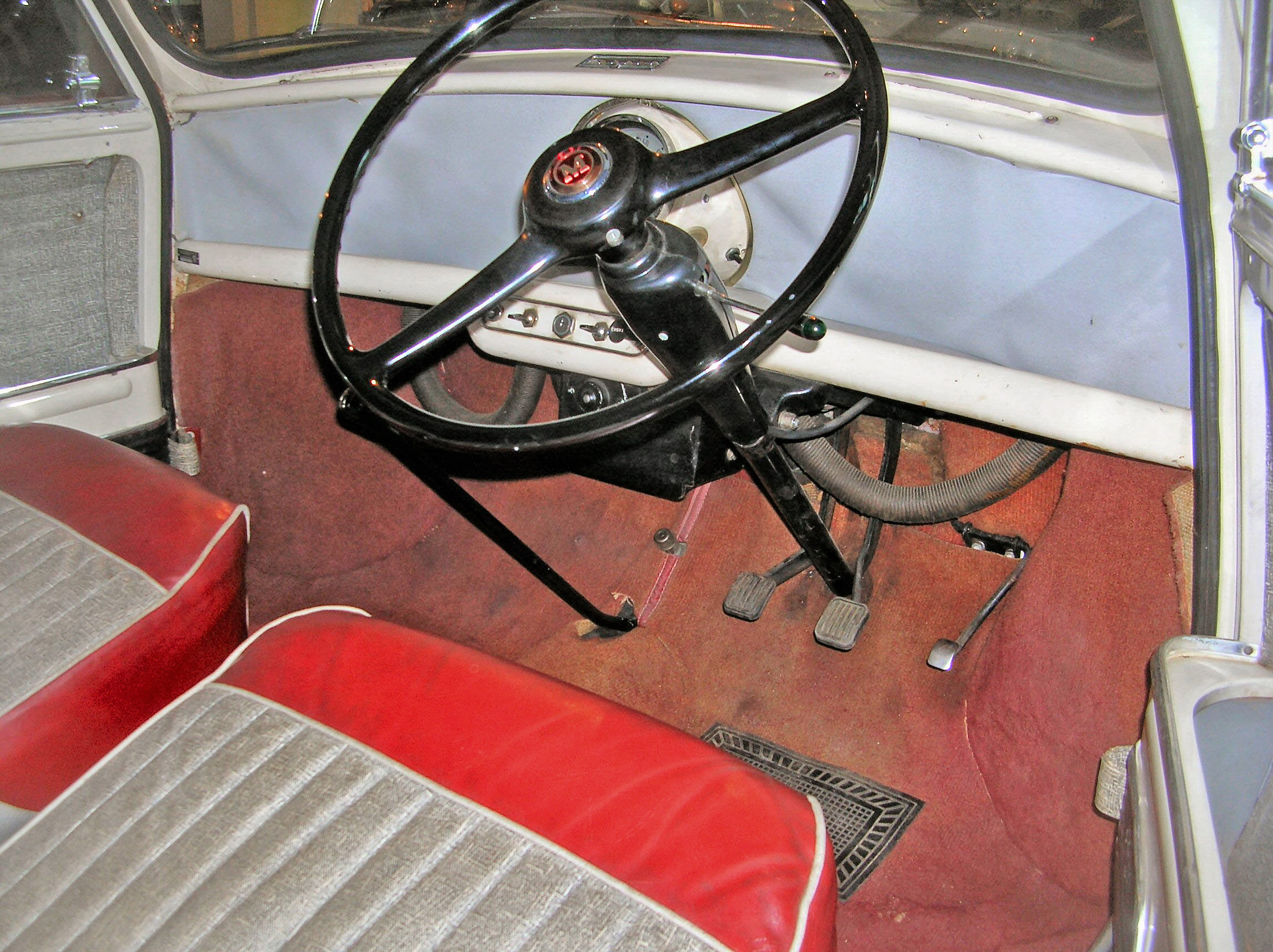
1959 Morris Mini-Minor interior

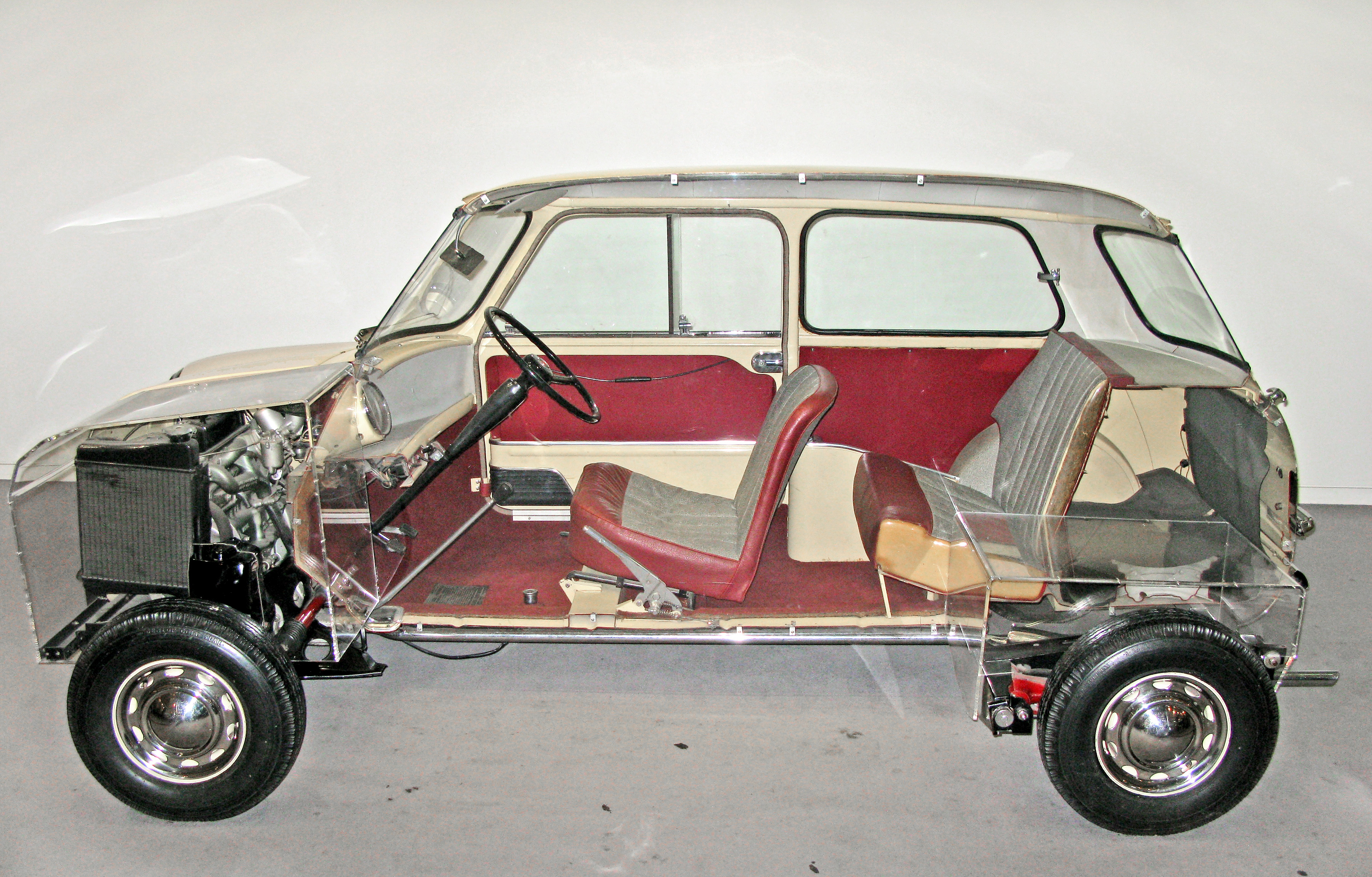
A cross-section shows how a Mini maximises passenger space.

The Mini came about because of a fuel shortage caused by the 1956 Suez Crisis. Petrol was once again rationed in the UK, sales of large cars slumped, and the market for German bubble cars boomed, even in countries such as the United Kingdom, where imported cars were still a rarity.

Leonard Lord, the head of BMC, reportedly detested these cars so much that he vowed to rid the streets of them and design a 'proper miniature car'. He laid down some basic design requirements – the car should be contained within a box that measured 10×4×4 feet (3.0×1.2×1.2 m); and the passenger accommodation should occupy 6 feet (1.8 m) of the 10-foot (3.0 m) length; and the engine, for reasons of cost, should be an existing unit.

Alec Issigonis, who had been working for Alvis, had been recruited back to BMC in 1955 with a brief from Lord to design a range of technically advanced family cars in the same innovative spirit as his earlier Morris Minor to complement BMC's existing conventional models. Issigonis had set out design projects for three cars – large and small family cars and a very small economy car. His initial work was on the largest car, designated XC9001, with the smallest car, XC9003, having the lowest priority despite it being Issigonis' greatest personal interest. With Lord's dictum to produce a bubble car competitor and his revised design requirements being laid down in October 1956, work on XC9001 stopped and XC9003 became the priority. In addition to Issigonis, the team that developed the Mini included John Sheppard (who had worked with Issigonis at Alvis), Jack Daniels (who had worked with Issigonis on the Morris Minor), Chris Kingham (also from Alvis), Charles Griffin (from Cowley), Vic Everton (from the body—jig shop), Ron Dovey (who built the bodies), Dick Gallimore (who laid out the experimental bodies), and George Cooper (whose job was to check the layouts). Together, by July 1957, they had designed and built the original XC9003 prototype, which was affectionately named the "Orange Box" because of its colour. Leonard Lord approved the car for production on 19 July and XC9003 became project ADO15.

The ADO15 used a conventional BMC A-Series four-cylinder, water-cooled engine, but departed from tradition by mounting it transversely, with the engine-oil lubricated, four-speed transmission in the sump, and by employing front-wheel drive. Drive was taken down to the transmission via a conventional clutch coupled to a set of primary gears on the end of the crankshaft which gave rise to the characteristic transmission "whine" for which the Mini became famous. Almost all small front-wheel drive cars developed since have used a similar configuration, except with the transmission separately enclosed rather than using the engine oil and mounted directly onto the end of the crankshaft, but with unequal length driveshafts. The radiator was mounted at the left side of the car so that the engine-mounted fan could be retained, but with reversed pitch so that it blew air into the natural low pressure area under the front wing. This location saved vehicle length, but had the disadvantage of feeding the radiator with air that had been heated by passing over the engine. It also exposed the entire ignition system to the direct entry of rainwater through the grille. Early prototypes used the existing 948 cc A-Series unit, but this provided the ADO15 with performance far greater than its price and purpose required – a top speed of about 80 mph (129 km/h). The engine was reduced to a new 848 cc capacity with a shorter stroke. This reduced power from 37 to 33 bhp and caused a significant drop in torque, so provided more realistic performance, especially when the ADO15 body was widened by 2 inches (5.08 cm) over the XC9003 prototype, which blunted the car's top speed while improving its stability and roadholding. Even so, the ADO15 had a top speed of 75 mph (121 km/h), which was better than many other economy cars of the time.

The suspension system, designed by Issigonis's friend Alex Moulton at Moulton Developments Limited, used compact rubber cones instead of conventional springs. This space-saving design also featured rising progressive-rate springing of the cones, and provided some natural damping, in addition to the normal dampers. Built into the subframes, the rubber cone system gave a raw and bumpy ride accentuated by the woven-webbing seats, but the rigidity of the rubber cones, together with the wheels' positioning at the corners of the car, gave the Mini go kart-like handling.

Initially, an interconnected fluid system was planned, similar to the one that Alec Issigonis and Alex Moulton were working on in the mid-1950s at Alvis. They had assessed the mechanically interconnected Citroën 2CV suspension at that time (according to an interview by Moulton with Car Magazine in the late 1990s), which inspired the design of the Hydrolastic suspension system for the Mini and Morris/Austin 1100, to try to keep the benefits of the 2CV system (ride comfort, body levelling, keeping the roadwheel under good control and the tyres in contact with the road), but with added roll stiffness that the 2CV lacked. The short development time of the car meant this was not ready in time for the Mini's launch. The system intended for the Mini was further developed and the Hydrolastic system was first used on the Morris 1100, launched in 1962; the Mini gained the system later in 1964. As launched, the Mini had simpler suspension made from conical springs of solid rubber. These were compact, saving on intrusion into the cabin space, and required no maintenance. The conical shape gave the springs a progressive action, becoming stiffer at greater degrees of compression. This gave the ADO15 a smooth ride over small bumps, but minimised roll and pitch on more uneven surfaces. It also allowed the springs to cope with the huge variance in load between an unladen car (about 600 kg or 1300 lb) and a fully laden one (just over 1000 kg or 2240 lb, or a 70% increase).

Ten-inch (254 mm) wheels were specified, so new tyres had to be developed, the initial contract going to Dunlop. Issigonis went to Dunlop stating that he wanted even smaller, 8 in (203 mm) wheels (even though he had already settled on 10-inch). An agreement was made on the 10-inch size, after Dunlop rejected the eight-inch proposition. Many features were designed into the ADO15's interior to maximise its passenger and luggage space on top of the major savings allowed by the transverse engine and 10-inch wheels. Sliding windows allowed single-skin doors to be fitted, improving elbow room and reducing costs. A bracing bar was fitted across the door frame to brace the single skin and this was later adapted into a large storage bin on each door. Issigonis later said that he had sized the bins to carry the ingredients of his favourite drink, a dry martini in the correct proportions (one bottle of vermouth and 2 of Gordon's Gin). Similar bins were provided outboard of the rear seats, also serving a dual function of bracing the single-skin body panel. Small items could also be stowed under the rear seats, and early Minis were sold with optional wicker baskets specially shaped to slot under the seats. The fixed rear parcel shelf contributed to the rigidity of the body shell, although it did preclude fitting the ADO15 with a hatchback. The boot lid was hinged at the bottom so that the car could be driven with it open to increase luggage space. On early cars, the number plate, together with its light, was hinged at the top so that it could swing down to remain visible when the boot lid was open. This feature was later discontinued after it was discovered that exhaust gases could leak into the cockpit when the boot was open.

The Mini was designed as a monocoque shell with welded seams visible on the outside of the car running down the A and C pillars, and between the body and the floor pan. Those that ran from the base of the A-pillar to the wheel well were described as 'everted' (lit., 'turned outward') to provide more room for the front seat occupants. To further simplify construction, the hinges for the doors and boot lid were mounted externally. This also saved a small amount of cabin space. It also made the ADO15 very easy to assemble from complete knock-down kits in overseas markets with only basic industry. Cars could be assembled with minimal use of jigs as the external seams made the panels largely 'self-aligning'. They also allowed panels to be stacked flat on top of one other for easy shipping. As originally built, all the structural body panels were welded to the top of the single floor pressing, but this caused major problems with water entering the cabin and was quickly changed in the first months of production.

Early prototypes were fully unitary in construction, but the cars broke apart under the high loads from the large lever ratios used with the rubber cone suspension. The design was changed to use steel subframes to carry the drivetrain and suspension for the front and rear. This also simplified production, as both subframes could be built up independently and then mated to the already-completed bodyshell. It also opened up the possibility of easily producing variants on the ADO15 as a body of any shape or design could be used provided it could accommodate the subframes.

In 1959, BMC and Alec Issigonis won the Dewar Trophy, for the design and production of the Mini.

The Mini shape had become so well known that by the 1990s, Rover Group – the heirs to BMC – were able to register its design as a trademark in its own right.

== Mark I: 1959–1967 ==
Mini "Mark I"
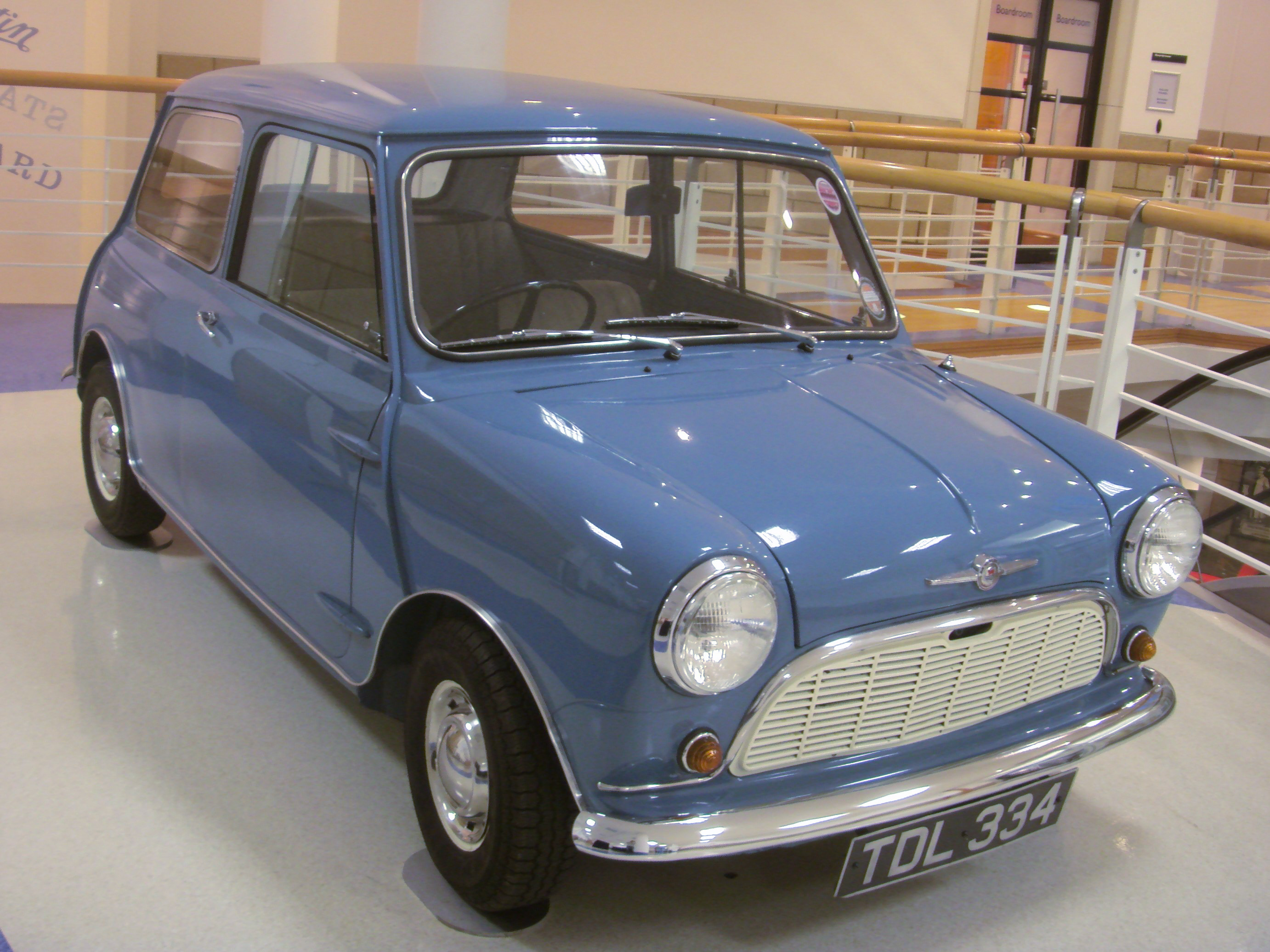
- 1959 Morris Mini Minor

Overview
- Also called: Austin 850; Austin Mini; Austin Partner; Austin Seven; Innocenti Mini; Morris 850; Morris Mini Minor; Riley Elf; Wolseley Hornet
- Production: 1959–1967
- Assembly: United Kingdom; Australia; New Zealand
- Designer: Sir Alec Issigonis

Body and chassis
- Body style: 2-door saloon; 2-door estate; 2-door van; 2-door pickup

Powertrain
- Engine: 848–1275 cc BMC A-Series I4s

The production version of the Mini was demonstrated to the press in April 1959, and by August, several thousand cars had been produced ready for the first sales. The Mini was officially announced to the public on 26 August 1959. Some 2,000 cars had already been sent abroad and were displayed that day in almost 100 countries. The key dimensions were:

- wheelbase: 6 ft 8 in (2,032 mm)
- front track: 3 ft 11.75 in (1,213 mm)
- rear track: 3 ft 9.9 in (1,166 mm)
- length: 10 ft 0.25 in (3,054 mm)
- width: 4 ft 8 in (1,422 mm)
- height: 4 ft 7 in (1,397 mm)
- unladen weight: 1,290 lb (590 kg) (approx)

The first example, a Morris Mini-Minor with the registration 621 AOK, is on display at the Heritage Motor Centre in Warwickshire. Another early example from 1959 is on display at the National Motor Museum in Hampshire.

The Mini was marketed under BMC's two main brand names, Austin and Morris, until 1969, when it became a marque in its own right. The Morris version was known to all as "the Mini" or the "Morris Mini-Minor". This seems to have been a play on words: the Morris Minor was a larger, well known, and successful car that continued in production, and minor is Latin for "lesser", so an abbreviation of the Latin word for "least" – minimus – was used for the new even smaller car. One name proposed for the almost identical Austin version was Austin Newmarket, but it was sold as the Austin Seven (sometimes written as SE7EN in early publicity material – with the '7' using the letter V rotated anticlockwise so it approximated the number 7), which recalled the popular small Austin 7 of the 1920s and 1930s.

Until 1962, the cars appeared in North America and France as the Austin 850 and Morris 850, and in Denmark as the Austin Partner (until 1964) and Morris Mascot (until 1981). It was introduced in Australia as Morris 850 only (not "Austin"), and then later as Morris Cooper and Morris Cooper S versions, as well. The Morris name Mini (Mini-Minor) was first used for Austin's version by BMC in 1961 when the Austin Seven was rebranded as the Austin Mini, somewhat to the surprise of the Sharp's Commercials car company (later known as Bond Cars), who had been using the name Minicar for their three-wheeled vehicles since 1949. However, legal action was somehow averted, and BMC used the name "Mini" thereafter.

In 1964, the suspension of the cars was replaced by another Moulton design, the Hydrolastic system. The new suspension gave a softer ride, but it also increased weight and production cost. In 1971, the original rubber suspension reappeared and was retained for the remaining life of the Mini.

From October 1965, the option of the unique Automotive Products designed four-speed automatic transmission became available. Cars fitted with this became the Mini-Matic.

Slow at the outset, Mark I sales strengthened across most of the model lines in the 1960s, and production totalled 1,190,000. Ford purchased a Mini and dismantled it to see if they could offer an alternative. Ford determined that the BMC must have been losing around £30 per car, so decided to produce a larger car – the Cortina, launched in 1962 – as its competitor in the budget market. BMC insisted that the way company overheads were shared out, the Mini always made money. Larger profits came from the popular De Luxe models and from optional extras such as seat belts, door mirrors, a heater, and a radio, which would be considered necessities on modern cars, as well as the various Cooper and Cooper S models.

The Mini entered into popular culture in the 1960s with well-publicised purchases by film and music stars.

The Cooper S version was also used by some British police forces as both a uniform and plainclothes car.

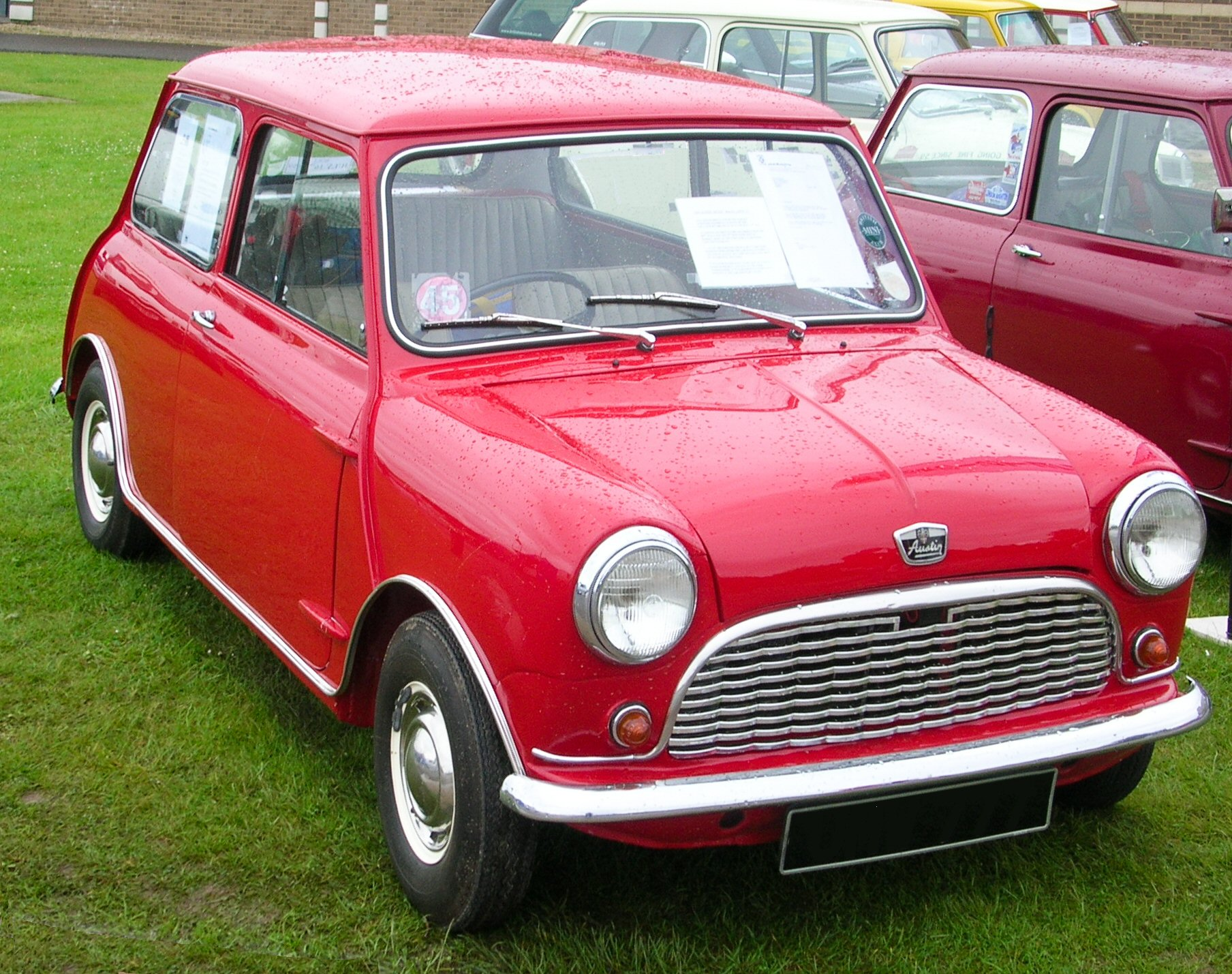
1959 Austin Seven

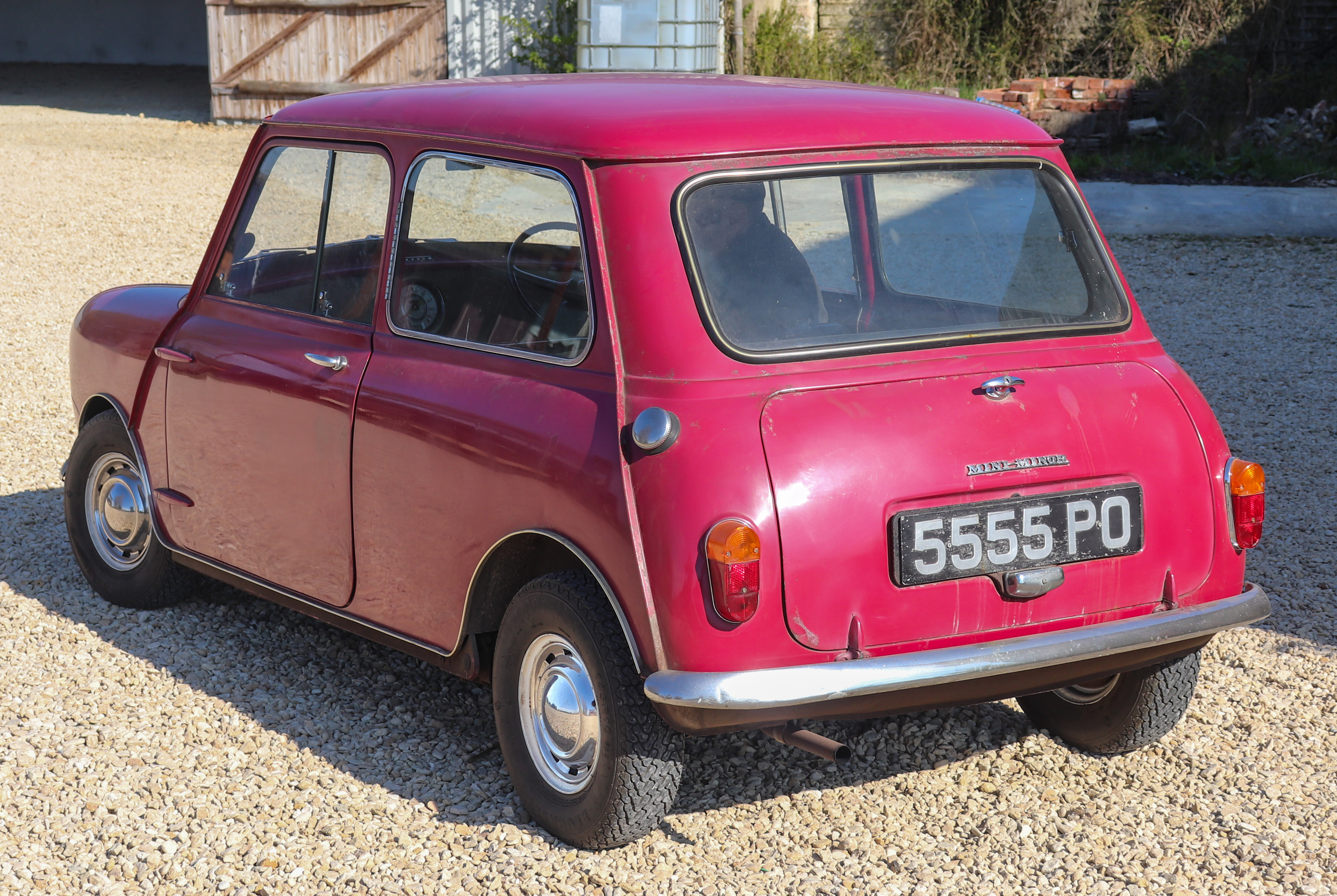
Morris Mini-Minor rear

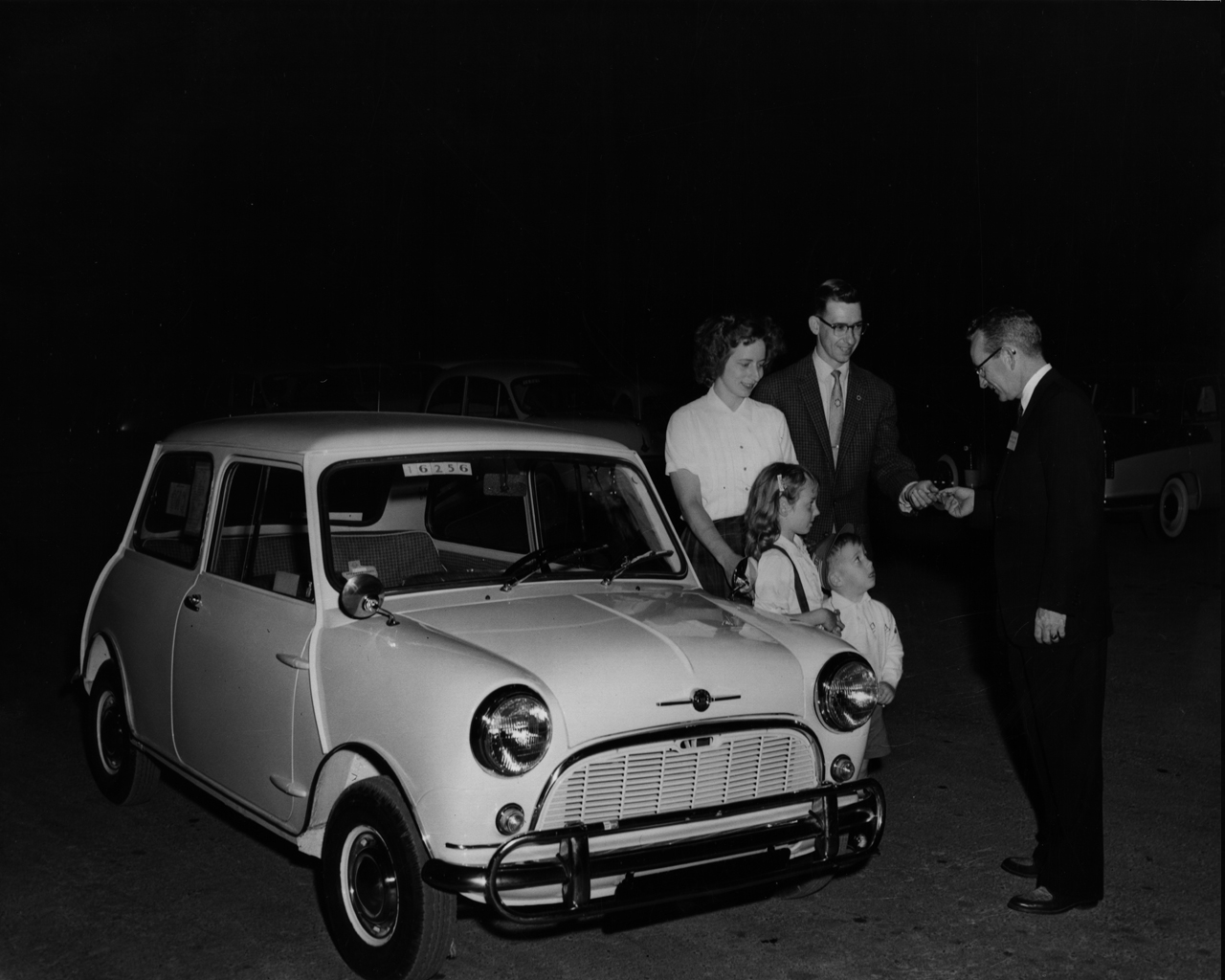
The first Morris Mini-Minor sold in Texas being delivered to a family in Arlington, Texas, in 1959

== Mark II: 1967–1970 ==
Mark II
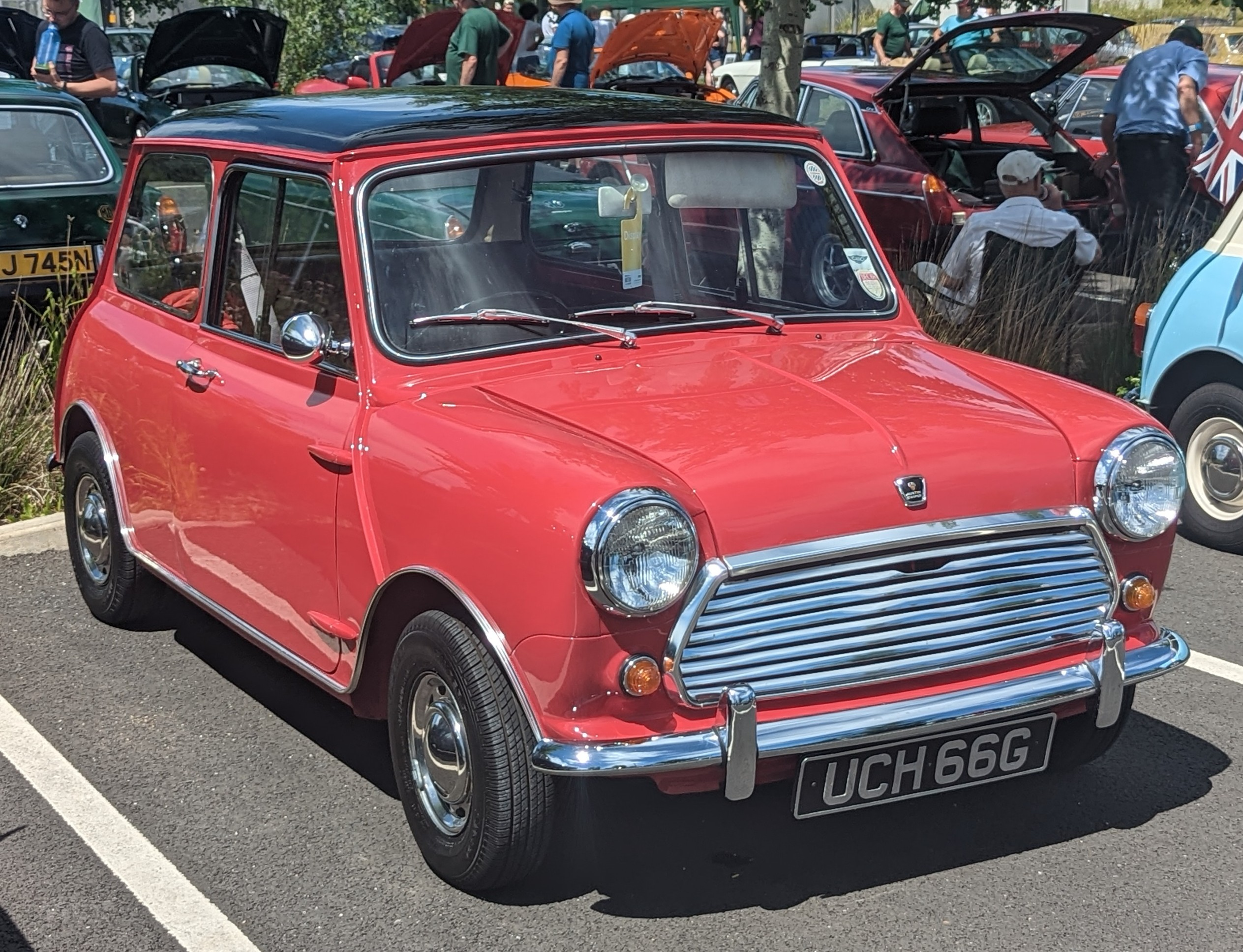

Overview
- Also called: Morris Mini Minor; Austin Mini; Austin Seven (Netherlands)
- Production: 1967–1970
- Assembly: United Kingdom: Longbridge, Birmingham (Longbridge plant); Belgium: Seneffe; Chile: Arica; New Zealand: Petone; Portugal: Setúbal; South Africa: Cape Town; Spain: Pamplona; Yugoslavia: Novo Mesto; Malaysia: Shah Alam

Body and chassis
- Body style: 2-door saloon; 2-door estate; 2-door van; 2-door pickup

Powertrain
- Engine: 848 cc (0.8 L) I4; 998 cc (1.0 L) I4; 1,275 cc (1.3 L) I4

The Mark II Mini was launched at the 1967 British Motor Show, and featured a redesigned grille, a larger rear window and numerous cosmetic changes. A total of 429,000 Mk II Minis were produced.

A variety of Mini types were made in Pamplona, Spain, by the Authi company from 1968 onwards, mostly under the Morris name. In 1969, a fibreglass version of the Mini Mark II was developed for British Leyland's Chilean subsidiary (British Leyland Automotores de Chile, S.A., originally the independent assembler EMSSA). The bodyshell mould was created by the Peel Engineering Company. Production began in 1970 and continued for a few years; these fibreglass Minis can be recognised by the missing body seams and by larger panel gaps. The Chilean market was never very large and the Arica plant was closed in 1974. The reason for the fibreglass body was to enable Leyland to meet very strict requirements for local sourcing, increasing to 70.22% in 1971.

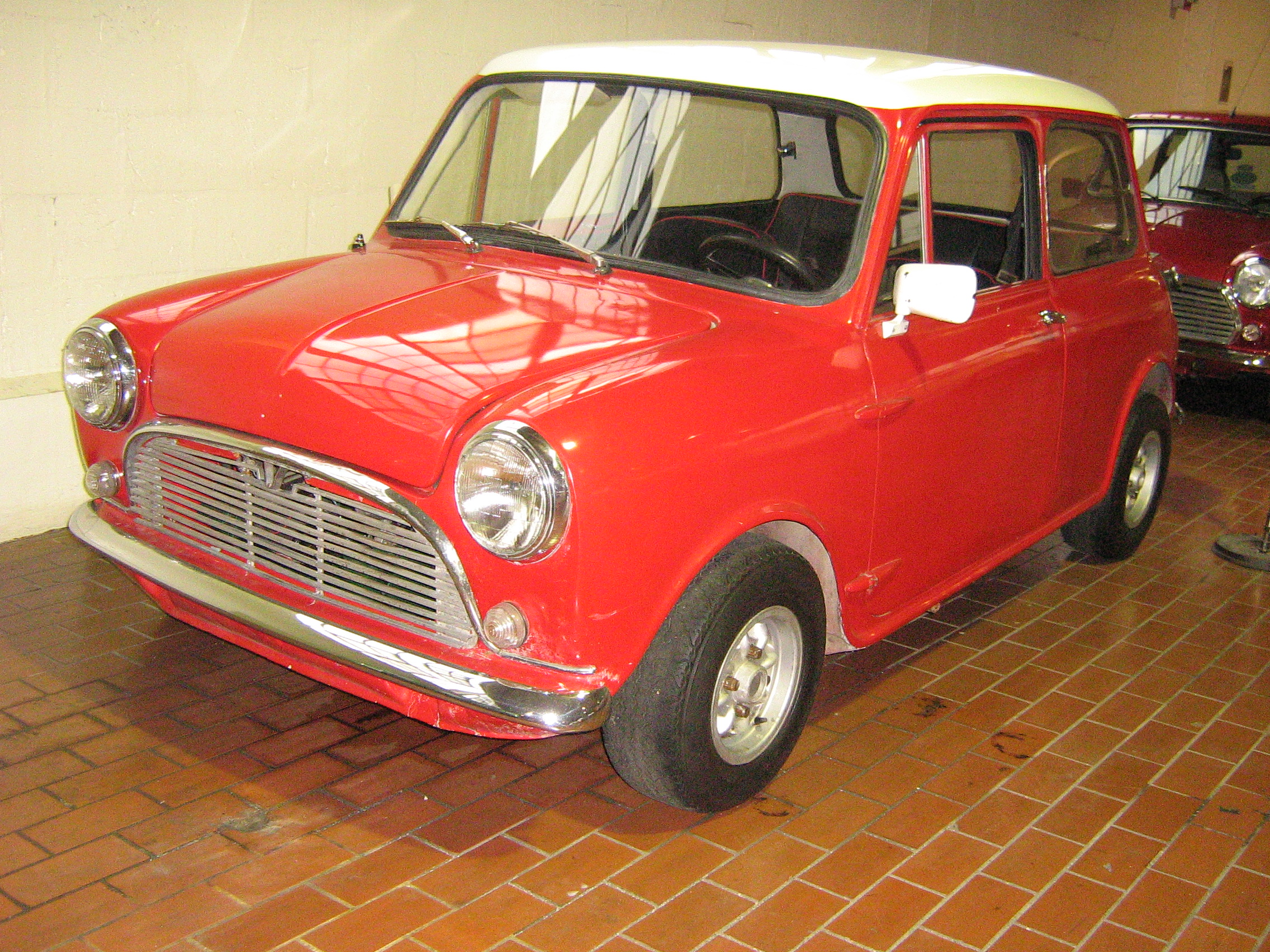
Chilean fibreglass-bodied Mini

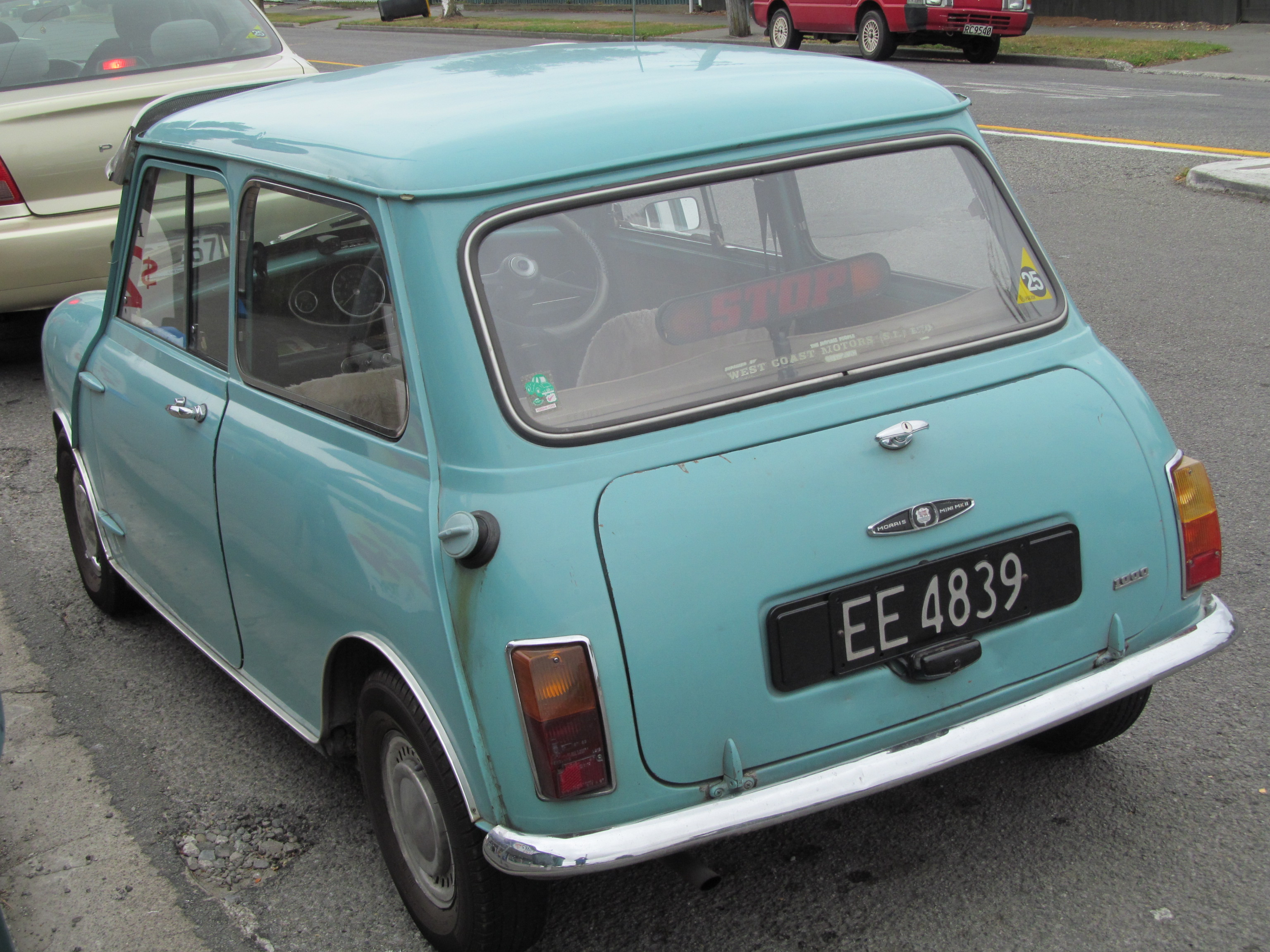
Morris Mini 1000 with larger windows and rear lights

== Mark III: 1969–1976 ==
Mark III
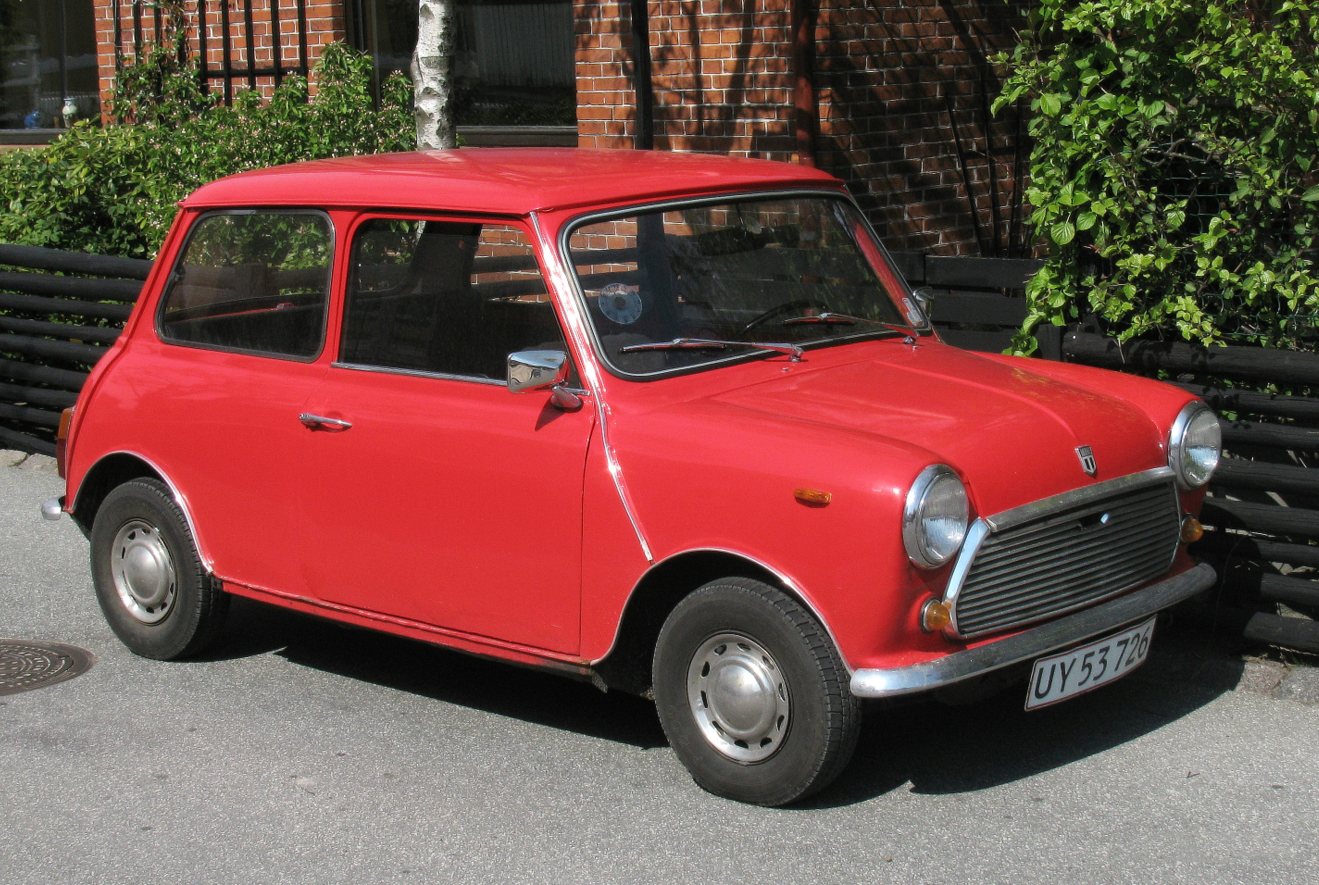
- 1970 Mini

Overview
- Manufacturer: British Leyland Motor Corporation
- Production: October 1969–1976
- Assembly: United Kingdom: Longbridge, Birmingham (Longbridge plant); Belgium: Seneffe; New Zealand: Petone; Portugal: Setúbal; South Africa: Cape Town; Spain: Pamplona

Body and chassis
- Body style: 2-door saloon; 2-door pick-up; 2-door van
- Layout: Front wheel drive
- Platform: ADO20

Powertrain
- Engine: 848 cc (0.8 L) I4; 998 cc (1.0 L) I4; 1,275 cc (1.3 L) I4
- Transmission: 4-speed manual

Dimensions
- Wheelbase: 2.04 m
- Length: 3.06 m
- Width: 1.42 m
- Height: 1.36 m
- Kerb weight: 610 kg (848 cc version); 645 kg (1275 cc version)

Chronology
- Predecessor: Mark II
- Successor: Mark IV

The Mark III Mini had a modified bodyshell with enough alterations to see the factory code change from ADO15 to ADO20 (which it shared with the Clubman). From the manufacturer's perspective, the ADO20 had a significantly simplified bodyshell, with fewer individual panels and pressings requiring fewer welding operations to construct. This reduced the time and cost of production and made the car more suited to automated production of the bodyshells. It also reduced the propensity of the Mini for water leaks. The most obvious changes were larger doors with concealed hinges. Customer demand led to the sliding windows being replaced with winding windows, although all Australian-manufactured Mark I Minis had adopted this feature in 1965 (with opening quarterlight windows). The suspension reverted from Hydrolastic to rubber cones as a cost-saving measure. (The 1275 GT and Clubman retained the Hydrolastic system until June 1971, when they, too, switched to the rubber cone suspension of the original Minis.)

In 1969, the simple name Mini completely replaced the separate Austin and Morris brands. In April 1974, a heater became standard equipment on the entry-level Mini 850, as well, having by then already been included in the standard specification of the other models for some time.

In the late 1970s, Innocenti introduced the Innocenti 90 and 120, Bertone-designed hatchbacks based on the Mini platform. Bertone also created a Mini Cooper equivalent, christened the Innocenti De Tomaso, that sported a 1275 cc engine similar to the MG Metro engine, but with an 11-stud head, a special inlet manifold, and used the "A" clutch instead of the "Verto" type. It also used homokinetic shafts instead of rubber couplings.

The Mini was still popular in the UK, but appeared increasingly outdated in the face of newer and more practical rivals. Since the late 1960s, plans had been in place for a newer and more practical supermini to replace it, though the Mini was still the only car of this size built by British Leyland for the home market.

== Mark IV: 1976–1983 ==
Mark IV
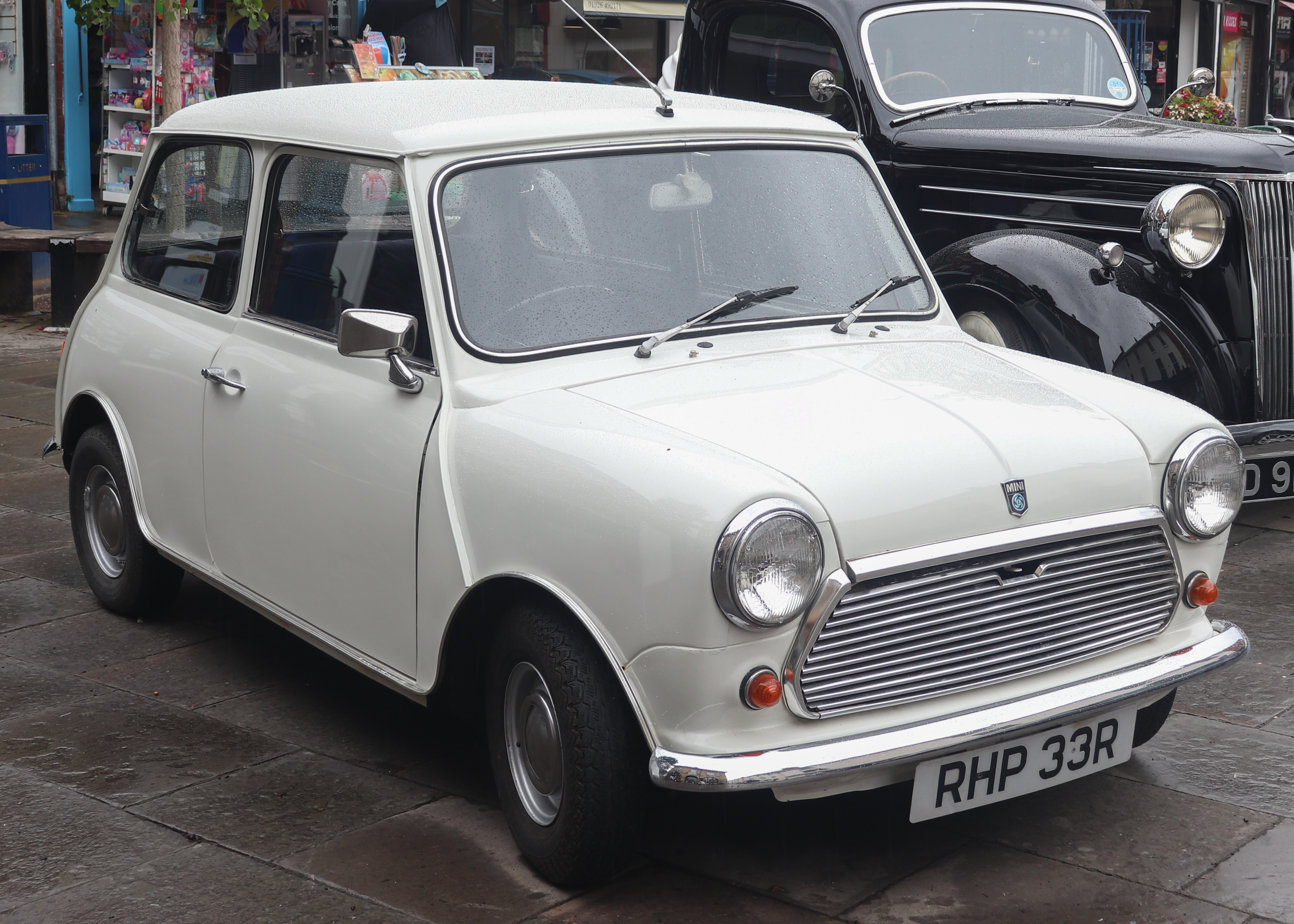
- 1976 Mini 1000

Overview
- Manufacturer: British Leyland Ltd.
- Production: 1976–1983
- Assembly: United Kingdom: Longbridge, Birmingham (Longbridge plant); Belgium: Seneffe; New Zealand: Petone; Portugal: Setúbal; South Africa: Cape Town

Body and chassis
- Body style: 2-door saloon; 2-door van; 2-door truck

Powertrain
- Engine: 848 cc (0.8 L) I4; 998 cc (1.0 L) I4; 1,098 cc (1.1 L) I4; 1,275 cc (1.3 L) I4

The Mark IV was introduced in 1976, though by this stage British Leyland was working on a new small car which was widely expected to replace the Mini before much longer. It had a front rubber-mounted subframe with single tower bolts and the rear frame had some larger bushings introduced, all intended to improve the car's mechanical refinement and to reduce noise levels. Twin column stalks for indicators and wipers were introduced, as were larger foot pedals. From 1977 onwards, the rear light clusters included reversing lights.

In July 1979 the lower end of the Mini range was altered. The basic Mini 850 (which had featured in various forms since the original launch 20 years before) was withdrawn. Its place was taken by two models at slightly lower and slightly higher price points. The new base model was the Mini City, with black-painted bumpers, an untrimmed lower fascia rail, part-fabric seats and wing mirror and sun visor only on the driver's side, plus unique 'City' body graphics and boot badge. Above the City was the new 850 SDL (Super Deluxe), which had the same specification as the standard Mini 1000 but with the smaller engine.

In August 1979 the Mini's 20th anniversary was marked by the introduction of the first true limited-edition Mini, which was the Mini 1100 Special. This was a 5,000-car run with the 1098 cc engine, broadly to the specification already in production for the European market as a standard model with the same name. However this was the first time a UK-market 'round-nose' (i.e. non-Clubman) Mini had been available with the 1098 cc engine, and the UK limited edition was also fitted with unique Exacton alloy wheels – the first time these were fitted to a factory-produced Mini – and plastic wheelarch extensions. Inside was the 1275GT's three-dial instrument cluster and a leather-rimmed wheel with a rectangular centre from the Innocenti Mini hatchback.

The 1100 Special and 850 City models were phased out by 1980, and during the same year the engine was upgraded to the improved A-Plus unit from the new Metro in 998 cc form, which was now the only engine available in the Mini. This was then followed by a number of incremental developments.

In 1978, the Mini was one of the key cars made available to disabled motorists under the new Motability scheme.

Reports of the Mini's imminent demise surfaced again in 1980 with the launch of the Austin Mini-Metro (badging with the word "mini" in all lowercase). Faced with competition from a new wave of modern superminis like the Ford Fiesta, Renault 5, and Volkswagen Polo, the Mini was beginning to fall out of favour in many export markets, with the South African, Australian, and New Zealand markets all stopping production around this time. Buyers of small cars now wanted modern and practical designs, usually with a hatchback. The Metro was therefore in essence, the Mini mechanicals repackaged into a larger hatchback bodyshell.

Although the Mini continued to be produced after the Metro's launch, production volumes were reduced as British Leyland and its successor Rover Group concentrated on the Metro as its key supermini. The original Mini's last year in the top ten of the UK's top selling cars was 1981, as it came ninth and the Metro was fifth. The arrival of the Metro also had production of the larger Allegro pruned back before it was finally discontinued in 1982. In 1982, BL made 56,297 Minis and over 175,000 Metros. Due to their common powertrain package, the Mini received many mechanical upgrades in the early 1980s which were shared with the Metro, such as the A-Plus engine, 12-inch wheels with front disc brakes, improved soundproofing and quieter, stronger transmissions. This not only modernised the Mini but, because many of its major subassemblies were now shared with the Metro, made it very cost-effective to produce despite falling sales volumes.

== Mark V: 1984–1990 ==
Mark V
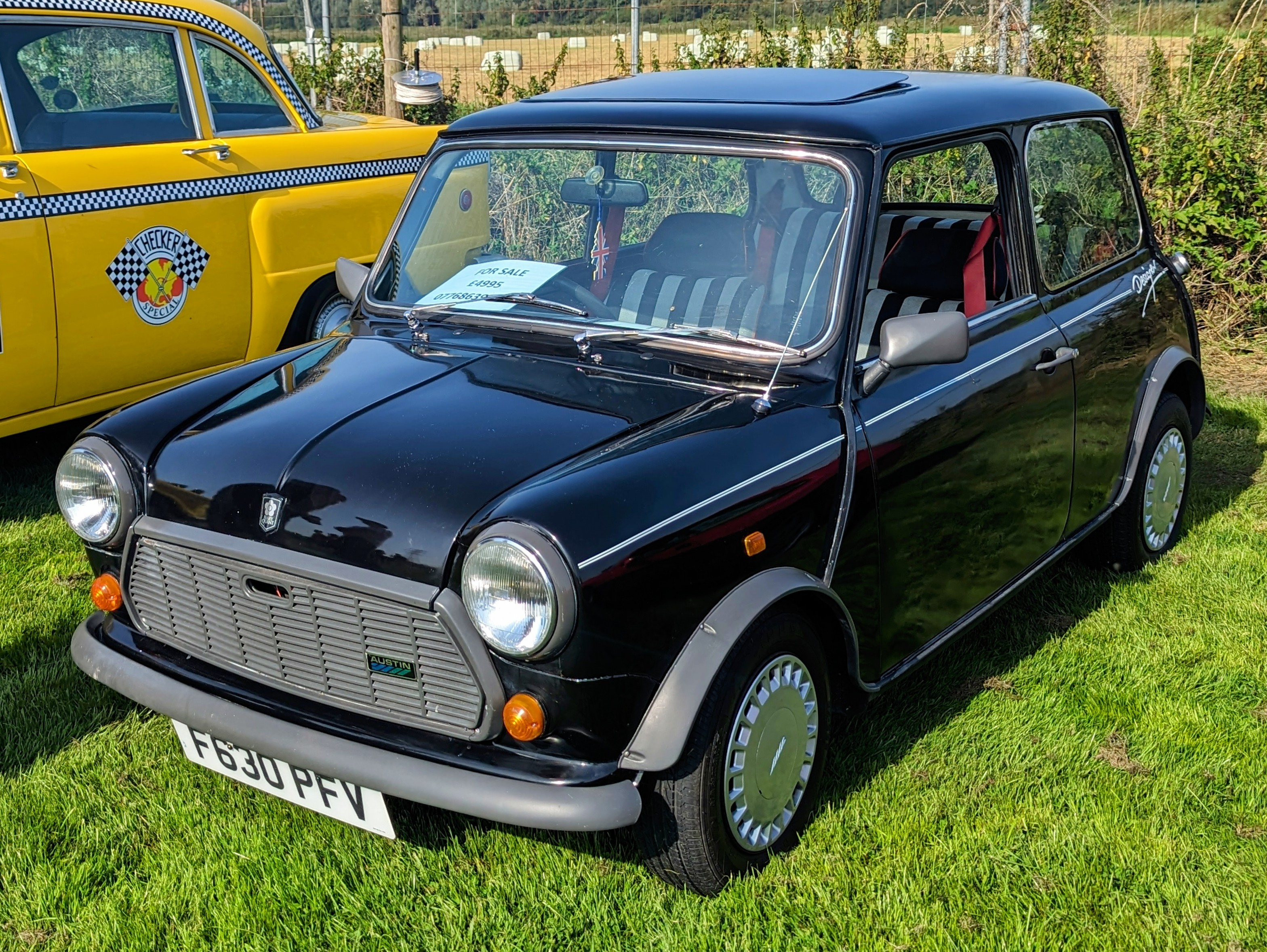
- 1988 Mini Designer

Overview
- Production: 1984–1990
- Assembly: United Kingdom: Longbridge, Birmingham (Longbridge plant)

Body and chassis
- Body style: 2-door saloon

Powertrain
- Engine: 998 cc (1.0 L) I4; 1,275 cc (1.3 L) I4

All cars had 8.4-inch (210 mm) brake discs and plastic wheel arches (Mini Special arches), but retained the same Mark IV body shell shape.

The Mini's 25th anniversary fell in 1984 and British Leyland produced a 'Mini 25' limited-edition model, both to mark the occasion and to publicise the recent upgrades to the model. This marked the start of a turnaround in the Mini's fortunes. Basic models such as the City and the City E (using the economy-tuned drivetrain from the Metro HLE) filled in the bottom of the Austin-Rover range and still found buyers who wanted a compact city car that was easy to park and cheap to run. Low purchase and running costs also made the Mini continually popular as a first car for younger drivers, and Austin-Rover introduced a steady stream of limited editions with bright paint colours, body graphics, and trim to appeal to this market. The Mini was also becoming prized as a characterful and nostalgic car in its own right, and the London Collection of limited-edition models was more upmarket and luxurious and named after affluent or fashionable parts of London.

These marketing strategies proved very successful; Mini production actually had modest increases through the mid-1980s, from 34,974 Minis in 1984 to 35,280 in 1985 and 39,800 in 1986. In 1990, the Mini Cooper was relaunched - 20 years after the demise of the original model – which saw Mini production pass 40,000. Once again, it featured the long-running 1275 cc engine which had featured on the original Mini Cooper S.

In 1988, Austin Rover decided to keep the Mini in production for as long as it was viable to do so, putting an end to reports that it would be discontinued by 1991, by which time the original Metro would also be replaced.

== Mark VI: 1990–1996 ==
Mark VI
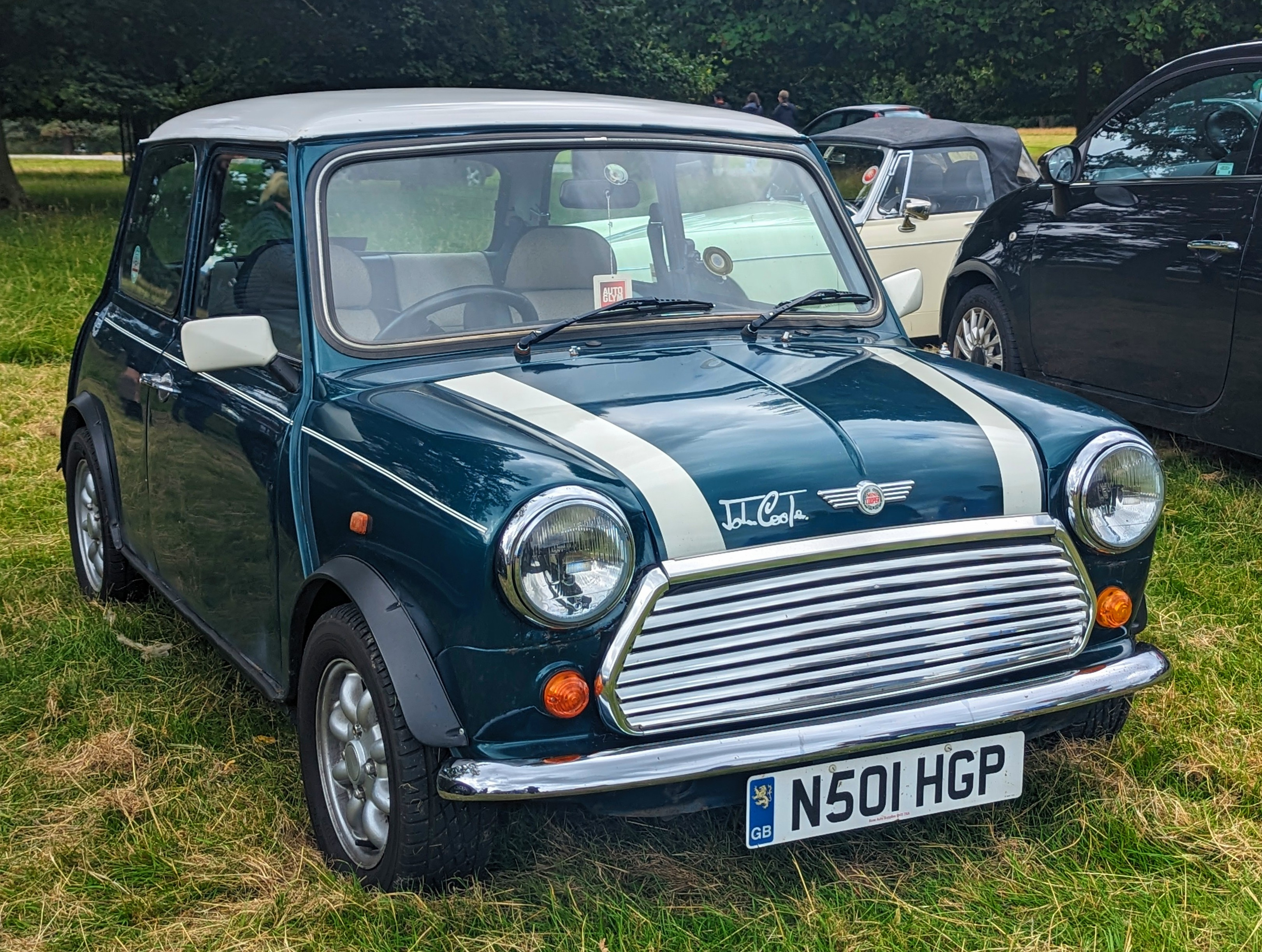

Overview
- Production: 1990–1996
- Assembly: United Kingdom: Longbridge, Birmingham (Longbridge plant); Venezuela

Body and chassis
- Body style: 2-door saloon

Powertrain
- Engine: 1275 cc A-Plus I4

With the larger Metro being redesigned in 1990 to take the new K-Series engine, the Mini became the sole recipient of the classic A-Series engine with transmission-in-sump layout. The engine mounting points were moved forward to take 1275 cc power units, and includes the later Horizontal Integral Float version of the SU carb, and also the single-point fuel-injection version, which came out in November 1991. The 998 cc power units were discontinued. Early, carburetted Coopers had a catalytic converter and produce 45 kW (60 hp; 61 PS) at 5500 rpm. Power crept up to 46 kW (62 hp; 63 PS) at 5700 rpm for the fuel injected model. An internal bonnet release was fitted from 1992. By 1991, the Cooper represented forty percent of Mini sales in the home market; the main export market was Japan. Production ended in August 1996 as the Mark VII replaced it.

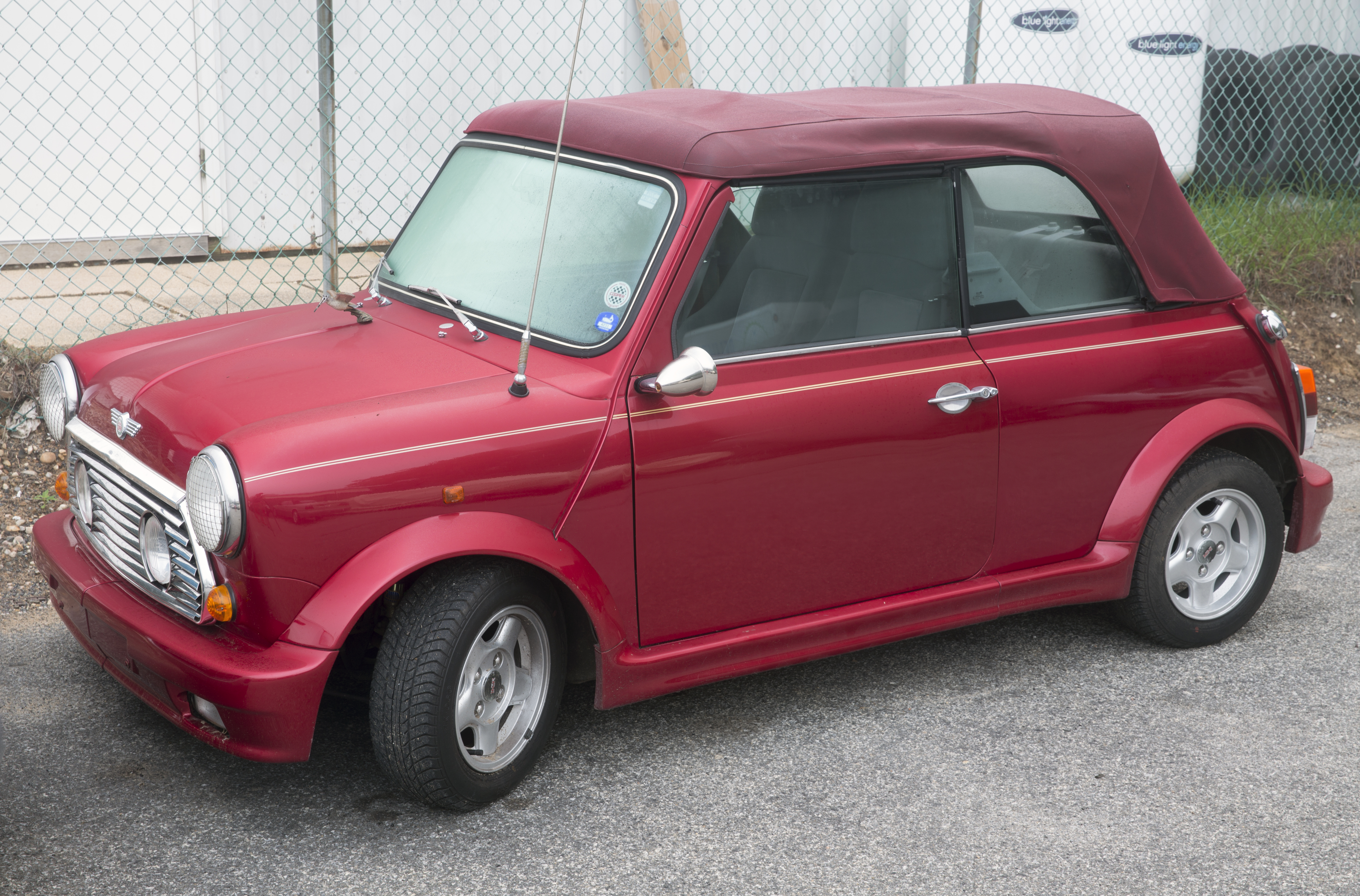
A 1994 Rover Mini 1300i Cabriolet

In the summer of 1991, 21 years after the fibreglass Mini built in Chile was produced, another fibreglass bodied Mini again entered production. This time, it was built in Venezuela and sold as the Mini Cord. The producer, Facorca, intended to sell the car in the Caribbean and Central America, and also had plans for Brazilian assembly.

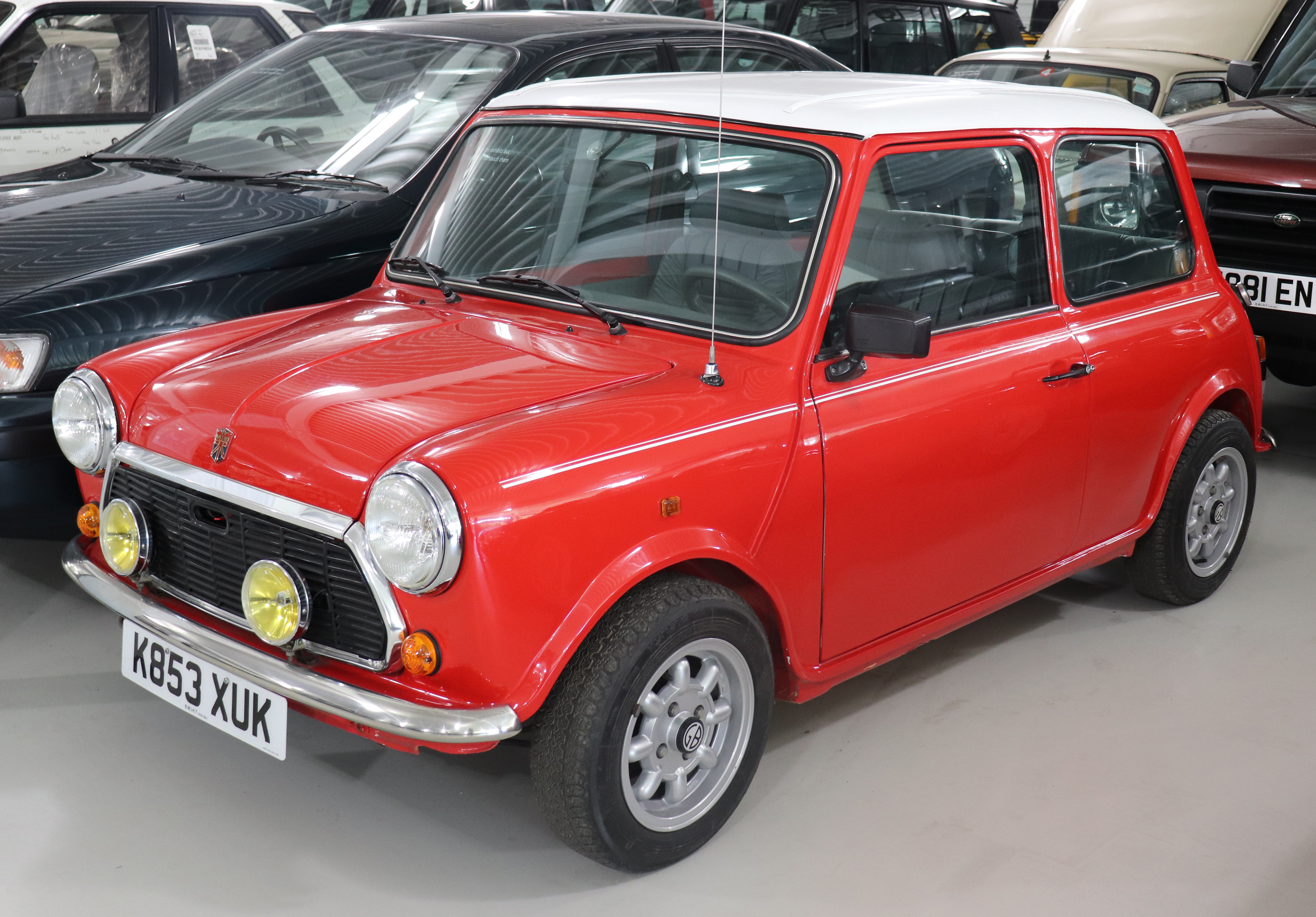
1992 Mini Cord built with a fibreglass body

== Mark VII: 1996–2000 ==
Mark VII
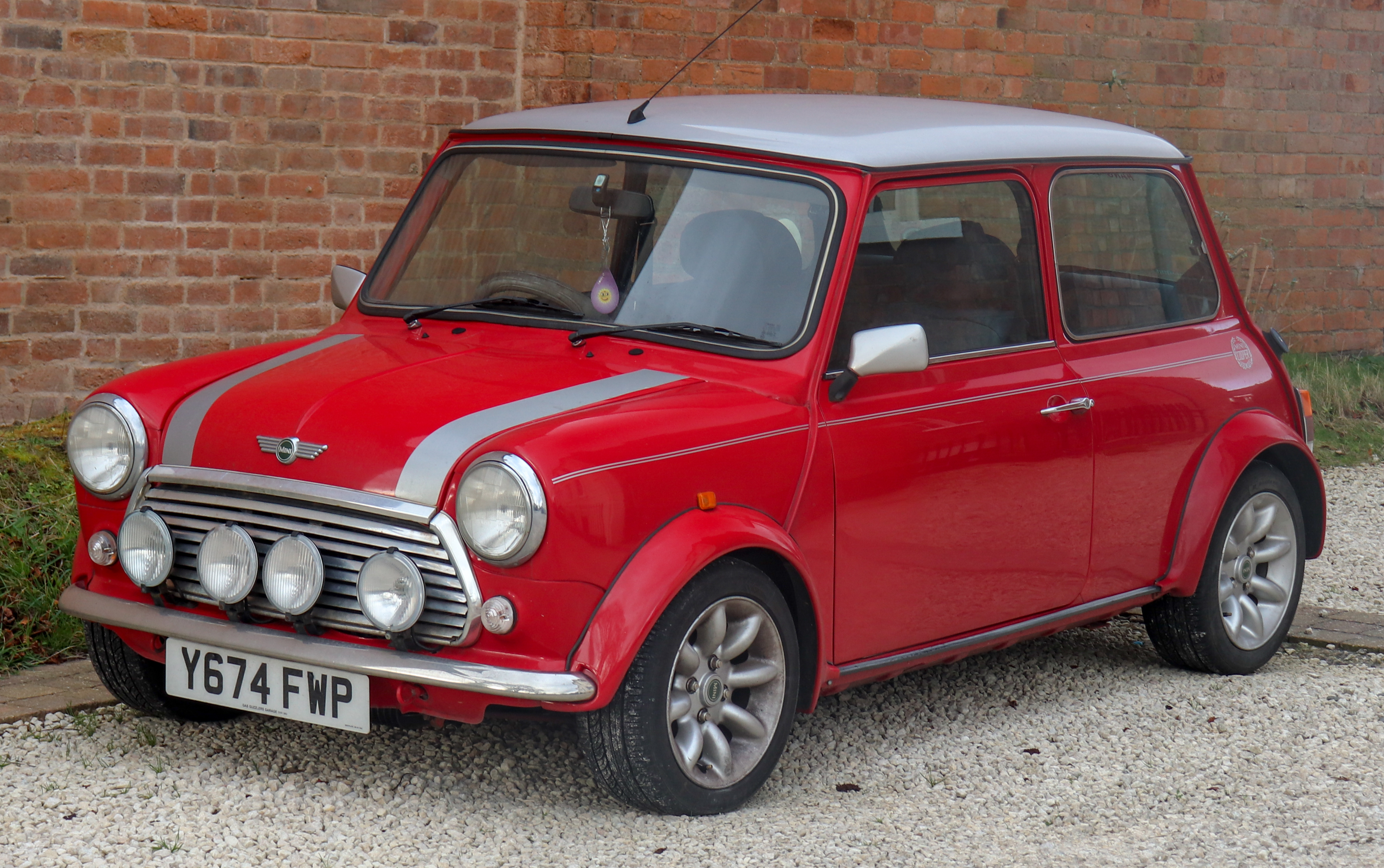

Overview
- Production: 1996–2000
- Assembly: United Kingdom: Longbridge, Birmingham (Longbridge plant)

Body and chassis
- Body style: 2-door saloon

Powertrain
- Engine: 1,275 cc (1.3 L) I4

This was the final version, twin point injection with front-mounted radiator. Full-width dashboard replaces the original shelf, internal bonnet release. Introduction of airbag on driver's side. The basic Mini was the 1.3i, the other model in the range being the Mini Cooper. The end of production in October 2000 not only signalled the end of original Mini production after 41 years, but also brought about the demise of the 1275 cc engine which had powered the Mini and numerous other BL/BMC/ARG cars for more than 35 years. The Metro had ceased production two and a half years earlier, meaning the Mini outlived the car that was supposed to replace it.

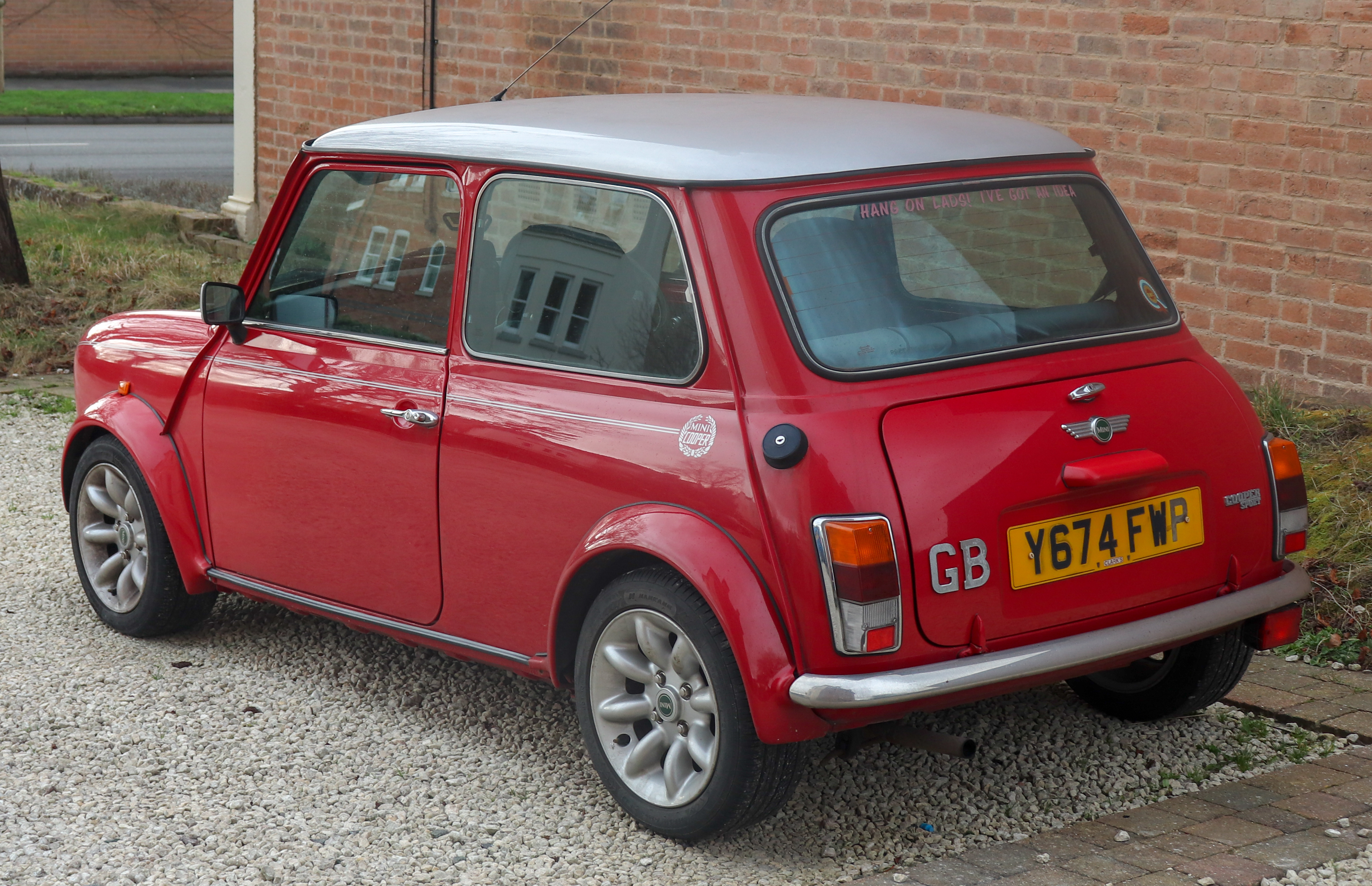
Rover Mini Cooper Sport rear

== Variants ==
The popularity of the original Mini spawned many models that targeted different markets.

=== Wolseley Hornet and Riley Elf (1961–1969) ===
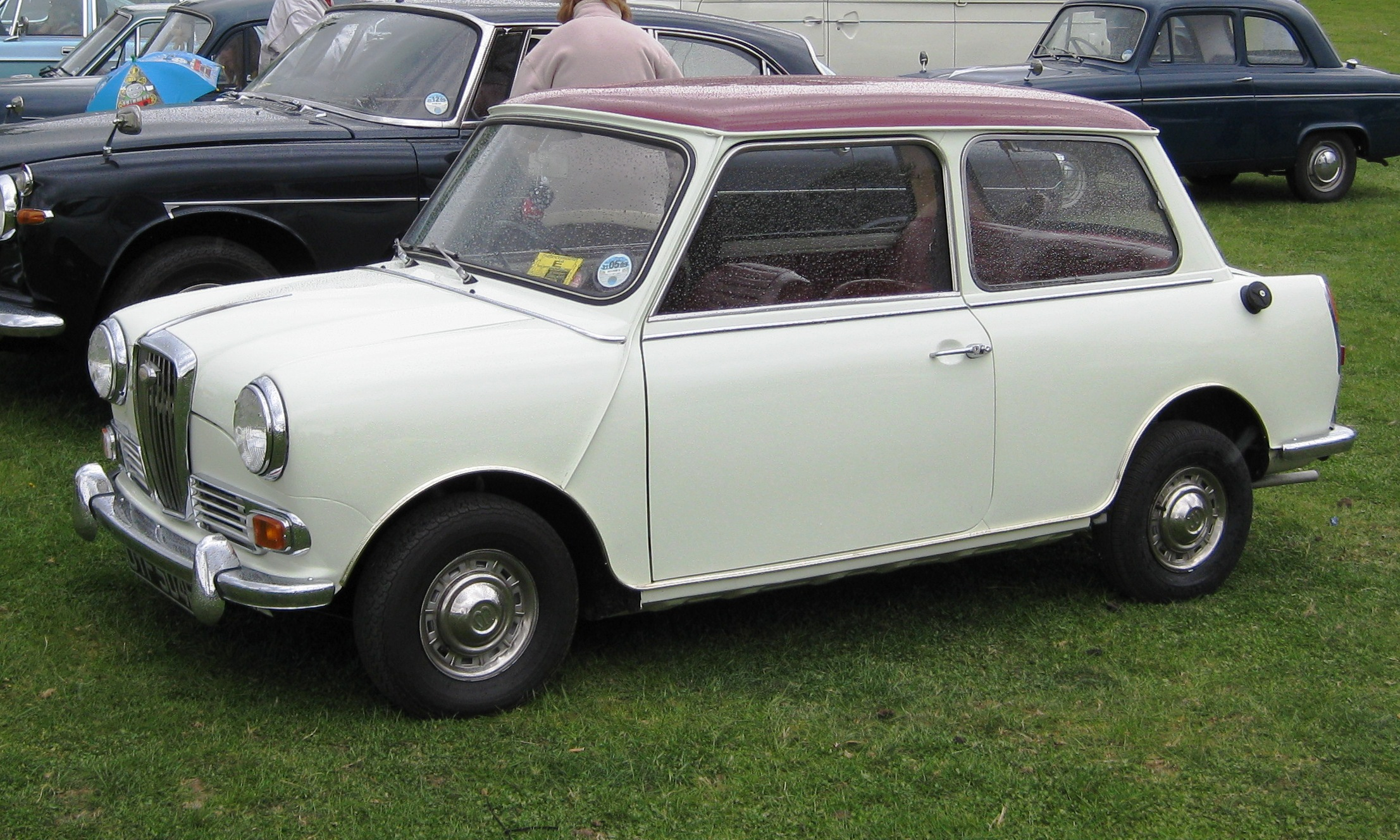
Wolseley Hornet Mark III

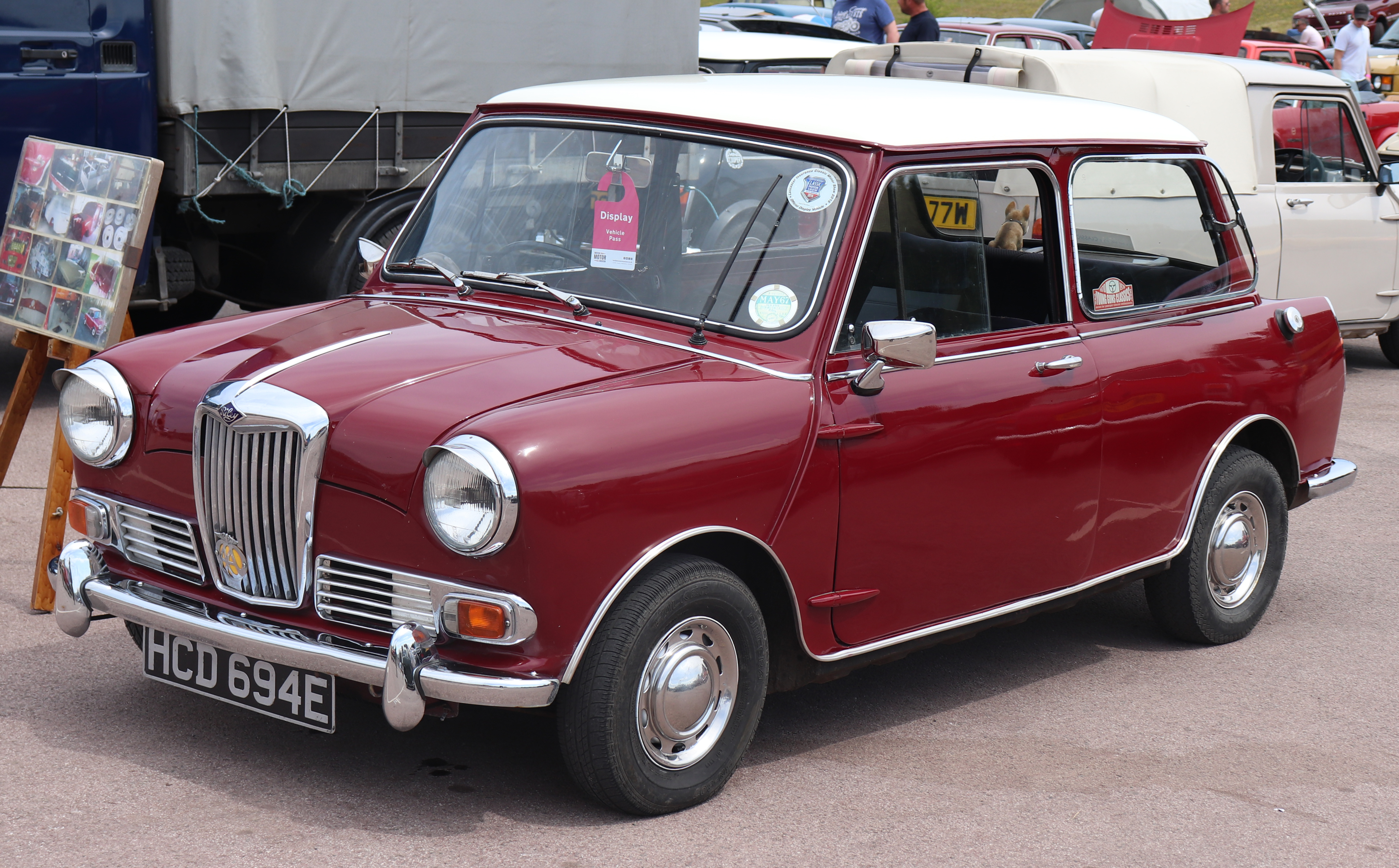
1967 Riley Elf Mark II

Released in 1961 as more luxurious versions of the Mini, both the Wolseley Hornet and the Riley Elf had longer, slightly finned rear wings and larger boots that gave the cars a more conventional three-box design. The wheelbase of the Elf and Hornet remained at 2,036 mm (80.2 in), whereas the overall length was increased to 3.27 m (10.7 ft). This resulted in a dry weight of 638 kg (1,407 lb)/642.3 kg (1,416 lb) (rubber/Hydrolastic suspension) for the Elf and 618 kg (1,362 lb)/636.4 kg (1,403 lb) for the Hornet.

Front-end treatment, which incorporated each marque's traditional upright grille design (the Hornet's grille with a lit "Wolseley" badge), also contributed to a less utilitarian appearance. The cars had larger-diameter chrome hubcaps than the Austin and Morris Minis, and additional chrome accents, bumper overriders and wood-veneer dashboards. The Riley was the more expensive of the two cars. The name "Wolseley Hornet" was first used on 1930s saloon, coupé, sports and racing cars, while the name "Elf" recalled the Riley Sprite and Imp sports cars, also of the 1930s (Riley's first choice of name "Imp" could not be used as Hillman had registered it). The full-width dashboard was a differentiator between the Elf and Hornet. This dashboard was the idea of Christopher Milner the Sales Manager for Riley.

Both the Riley Elf's and Wolseley Hornet's bodies were built at Fisher & Ludlow under their "Fisholow" brandname. Plates in the engine compartment on the right side fitch plate bear evidence of this speciality.

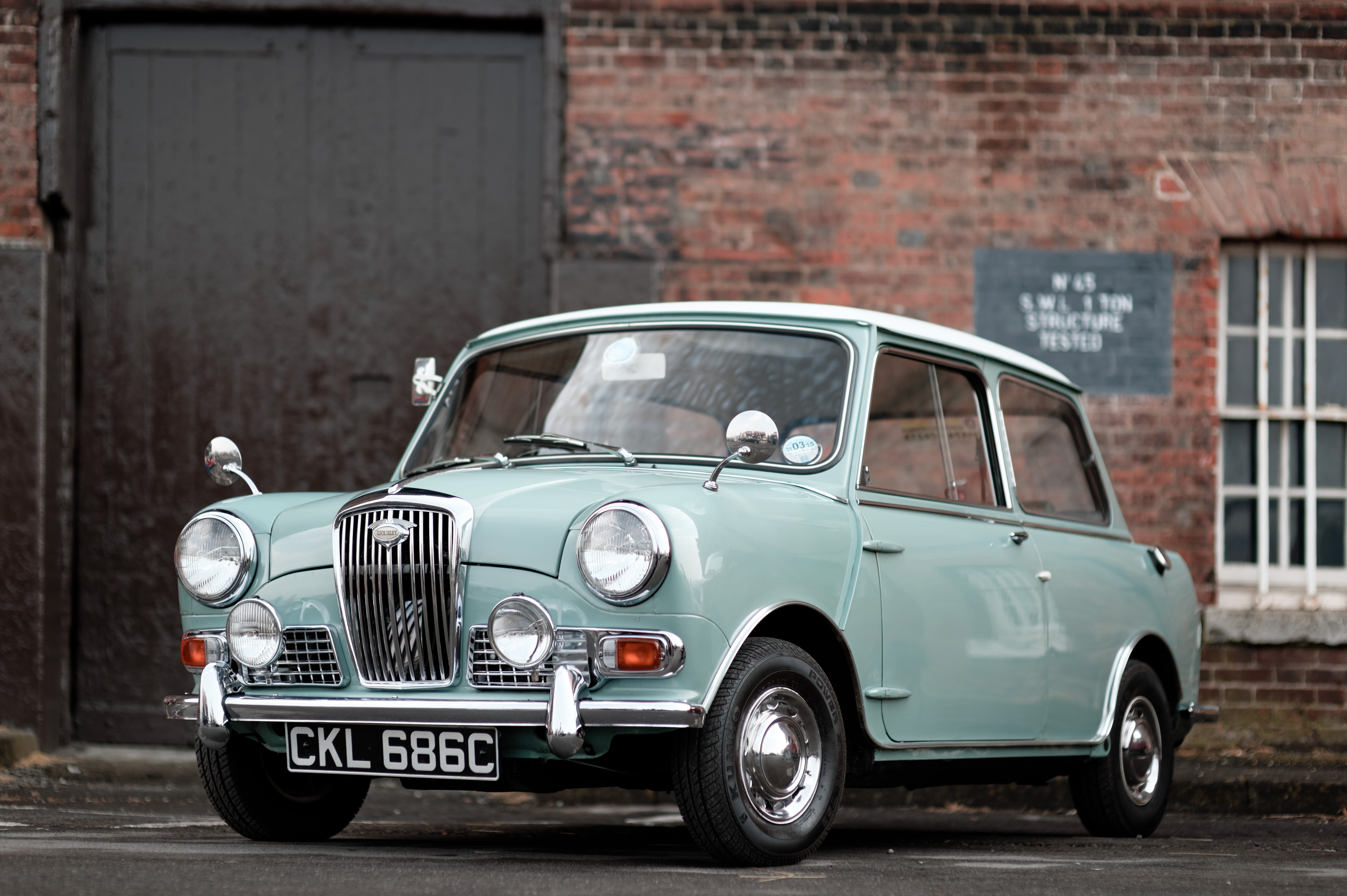
1965 Wolseley Hornet

Very early Mark I versions of both cars (e.g. press photo of 445MWL) had no overriders on the bumpers and a single piece front wing (A-panel and wing in one piece, no outside seam below scuttle panel) that was soon given up again, allegedly due to cost. The Elf's and Hornet's special bumper overriders first appeared in 1962. Early production Mark I's also had a combination of leather and cloth seats (Elf R-A2S1-101 to FR2333, Hornet W-A2S1-101 to FW2105) whereas all later models had full leather seats. Mark I models were equipped with single leading shoe brakes on the front.

In 1966 the Heinz food company commissioned, from Crayford Convertibles (Crayford Engineering), 57 convertible Hornets to be given as prizes in a UK competition. Many are still on the road as of 2020.

Both the Elf and the Hornet went through three engine versions. Initially, they used the 848 cc (51.7 cu in) 34 bhp (25 kW) engine (engine type 8WR) with a single HS2 carburettor, changing to a single HS2 carburettor 38 bhp (28 kW) version of the Cooper's 998 cc (60.9 cu in) power unit (engine type 9WR) in the Mark II in 1963. This increased the car's top speed from 71 to 77 mph (114 to 124 km/h). Therefore, Mark II cars also came with increased braking power in the form of front drum brakes with twin leading shoes to cope with the increased power output. Both Mark I and Mark II featured four-speed gearboxes (three synchromesh gears) with the original, long gear lever, a.k.a. "magic wand" type. Automatic gearboxes became available on the Mark II in 1965 as an option. The Mark III facelift of 1966 brought wind-up windows and fresh-air fascia vents. Concealed door hinges were introduced two years before these were seen on the mainstream Mini. The gear selecting mechanism was updated to the "Cooper" type, (which also gave a welcome increase in engine location due to the remote housing extension being directly bolted onto the back of the differential housing) as seen on Mini 1000 cars of the time. The 850s retained the "magic wand". Automatic gearboxes were available to the Mark III in 1967 again. Full-four synchromesh gearing was eventually introduced during 1968. 30,912 Riley Elfs and 28,455 Wolseley Hornets were built. Production of both models ceased in late 1969.

Vehicle identification – serial number prefix letter code:

- First prefix letter – name: R-Riley, W-Wolseley
- Second prefix letter – engine type: A
- Third prefix letter – body type: 2S – 2-door Saloon
- Fourth prefix – series of model: 1 – 1st series, 2 – 2nd series, 3 – 3rd series
- Fifth prefix (used to denote cars different from standard right hand drive): L – left hand drive

Code example: R-A2S1-154321 (Riley, A type engine, 2 door saloon, 1st series, serial number "154321")

=== Morris Mini Traveller and Austin Mini Countryman (1960–1969) ===
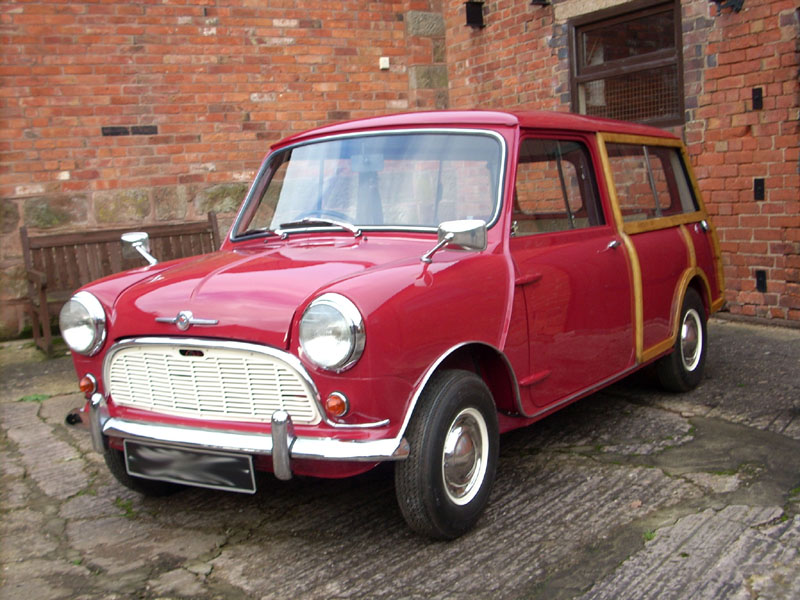
Morris Mini Traveller Mk1 with internal fuel tank

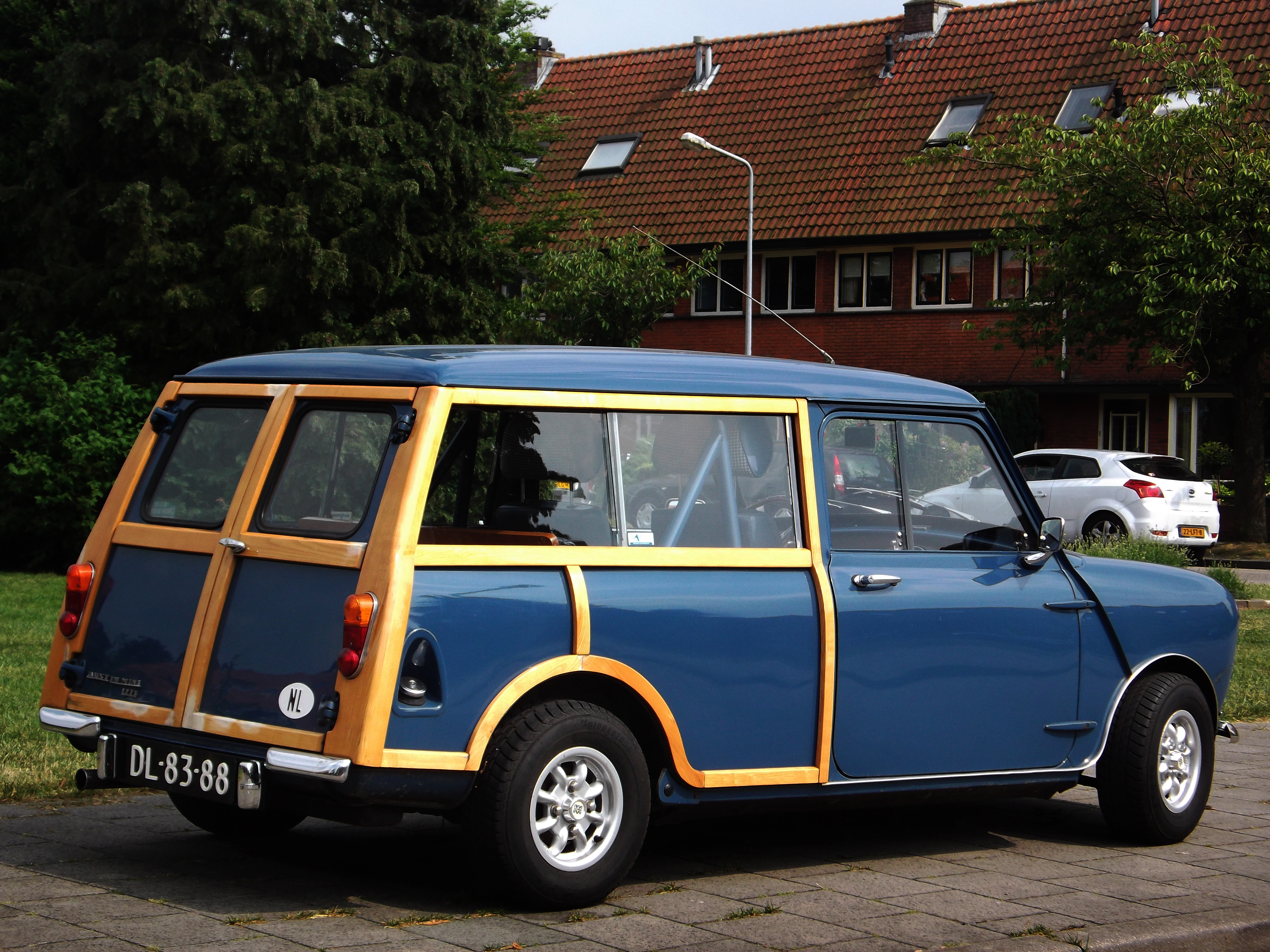
Austin Mini Countryman Mk2 with filler cap now moved to the lower right hand side of the car

These models were two-door estate cars with double "barn-style" rear doors. Both were built on a slightly longer chassis of 84 inches (2.1 m) compared to 80.25 inches (2.038 m) for the saloon.

The early Morris Mini Traveller and Austin Mini Countryman cars had an internal fuel tank located on the left hand side of the rear load area. This is identifiable by the fuel filler cap being on the left hand side of the car just below the rear window. In October 1961 the fuel tank was relocated to the underneath of the car and the filler cap was moved to low down on the right hand side of the car – the same configuration that was already in use on the Mini Van.

From the start of production both models had a decorative, non-structural, ash wood trim on the rear body, in the style of a pre-war shooting-brake. This gave the car a similar appearance to the larger Morris Minor Traveller and gave rise to these cars simply being called a woodie. It is a popular misconception that the difference between the Traveller and the Countryman is the wood trim, or that only wood-fitted models in the Austin and Morris ranges were respectively called Countryman and Traveller, with the plain versions simply being Estates, but neither of these is the case. An all steel version of both the Traveller and the Countryman without the wood trim was launched for export markets in April 1961 and for the home market in October 1962 at a lower cost than the versions with the wood trim. Estate versions of the Mini were then produced in both Austin Countryman and Morris Traveller variants, both available with or without the wooden framing. Some of these models also had front and rear folding seats that folded out flat in order to make a sleeping platform.

In October 1967 the Mk2 version was launched with the same changes as the saloon.

Approximately 108,000 Austin Mini Countrymans and 99,000 Morris Mini Travellers were built. Variations of this model were also built in South Africa, by Innocenti in Italy and by Industria de Montagem de Automoveis in Portugal.

The Mini Traveller and Countryman Register was created in 2009 to help locate and preserve the remaining Mini Traveller and Countryman cars.

=== Mini Van (1960–1983) ===
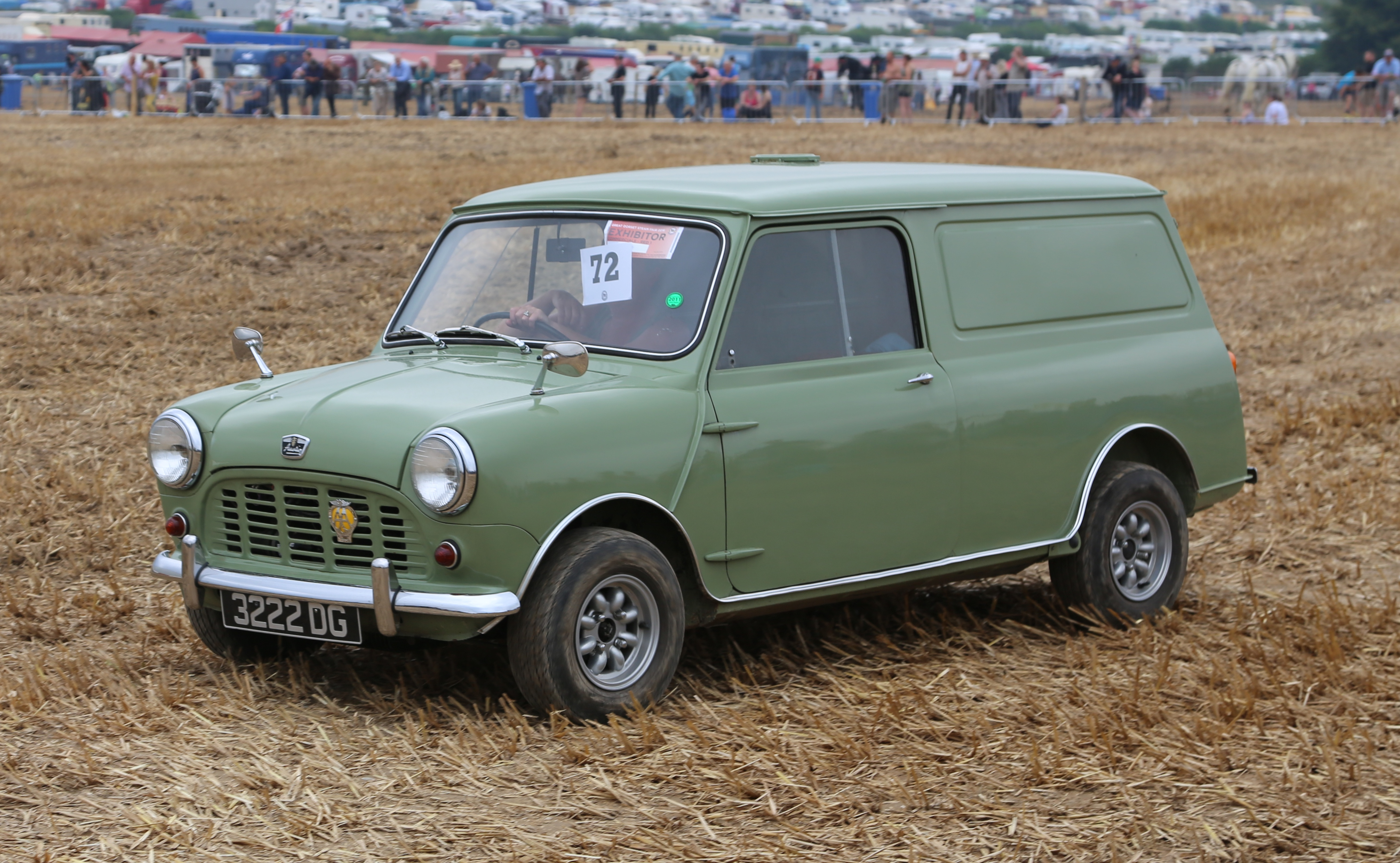
1963 Austin Mini Van

The Mini Van was a commercial panel van (in US English, a sedan delivery) rated at ¼-ton load capacity. Built on the longer Traveller chassis but without side windows, it proved popular in the 1960s UK as a cheaper alternative to the car: it was classed as a commercial vehicle and as such carried no sales tax. A set of simple stamped steel slots served in place of a more costly chrome grille. The Mini Van was renamed as the Mini 95 in 1978, the number representing the gross vehicle weight of 0.95 tons. 521,494 were built.

An Estate Van version with rear side windows was built in the late 1970s by IMA, the British Leyland factory in Portugal. It comes with a single rear window and single rear door, hinged at the top, that opens upwards for rear access.

=== Mini Moke (1964–1989) ===
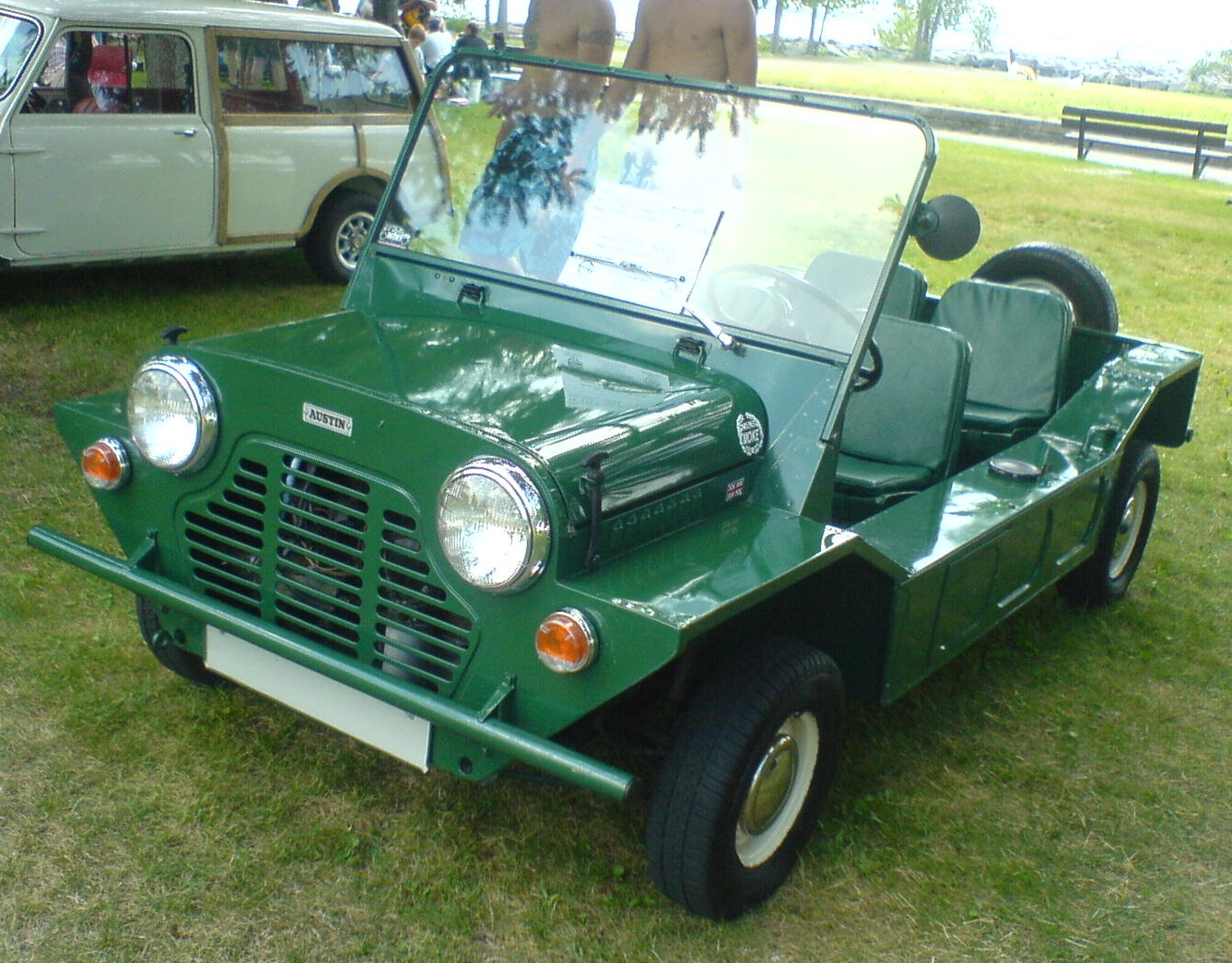
1967 Austin Mini Moke

A utility vehicle intended for the British Army was built with a twin-engined 4-wheel-drive. Although the 4WD Moke could climb a 1:2 gradient, it lacked enough ground clearance for military use. The single-engined front-wheel-drive Moke enjoyed some popularity in civilian production. About 50,000 were made in total, from 1964 to 1968 in the UK, 1966 to 1982 in Australia and 1983 to 1989 in Portugal. The Moke was marketed in holiday locations such as Barbados and Macau, where they were also used as police cars. "Moke" is archaic British slang for a donkey.

=== Mini Pick-up (1961–1983) ===
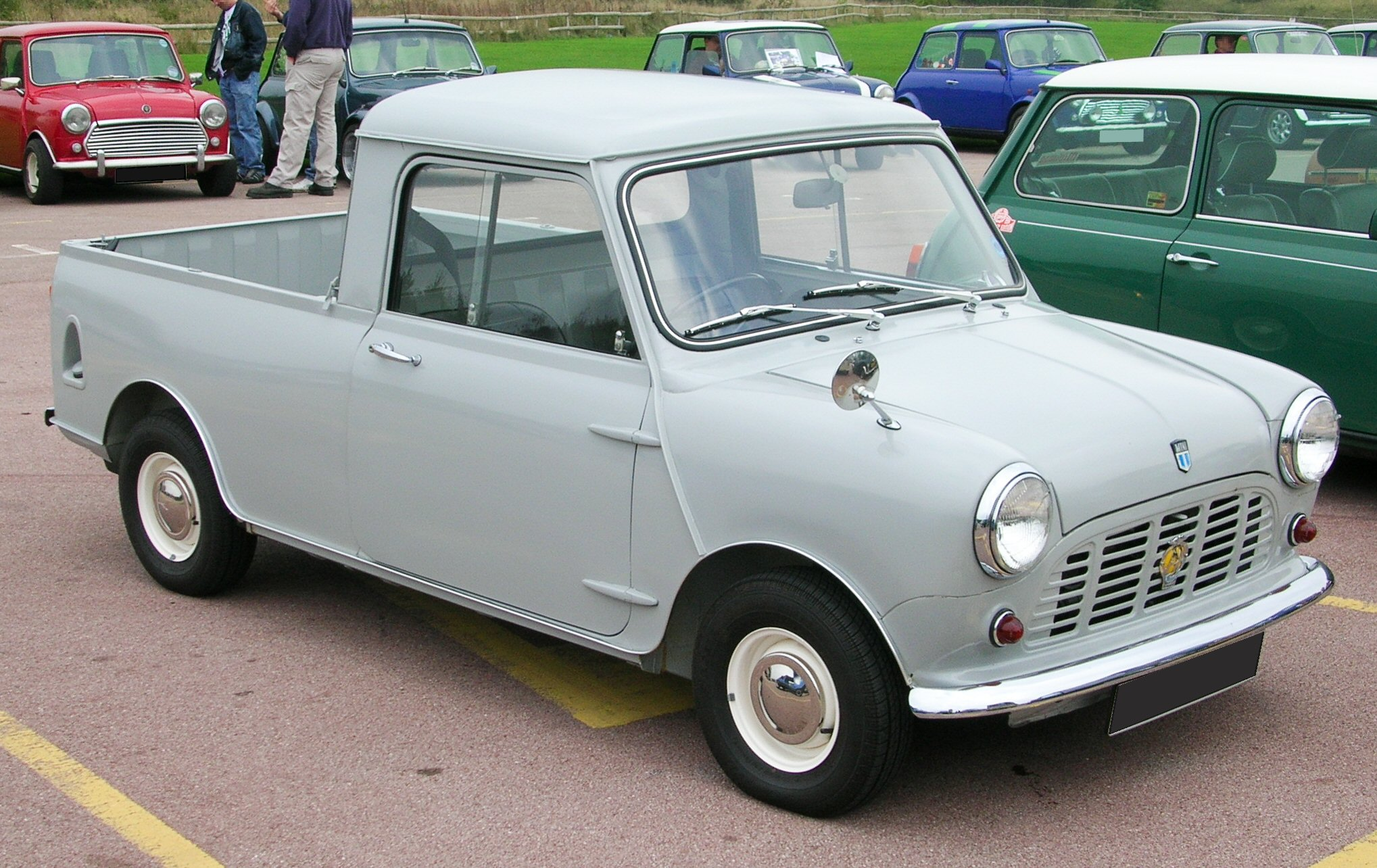
1972 Mini Pick-up

A pick-up truck 11 ft (3.4 m) in total length was built on the longer Mini Van platform, with an open-top rear cargo area and a tailgate. The factory specified the weight of the pick-up as less than 1,500 lb (680 kg) with a full 6 imperial gallons (27 L; 7.2 US gal) tank of fuel.

As with the van, the pick-up also had a stamped metal grille for airflow into the engine compartment. The Pickup was basic, although the factory brochure described a "fully equipped Mini Pick-up is also available which includes a recirculatory heater". Passenger-side sun visor, seat belts, laminated windscreen, tilt tubes and cover were also available at extra cost. Like the van, the pick-up was renamed as the Mini 95 in 1978.

A total of 58,179 Mini pick-up models were built.

=== Morris Mini K (March 1969 – August 1971, Australia only) ===
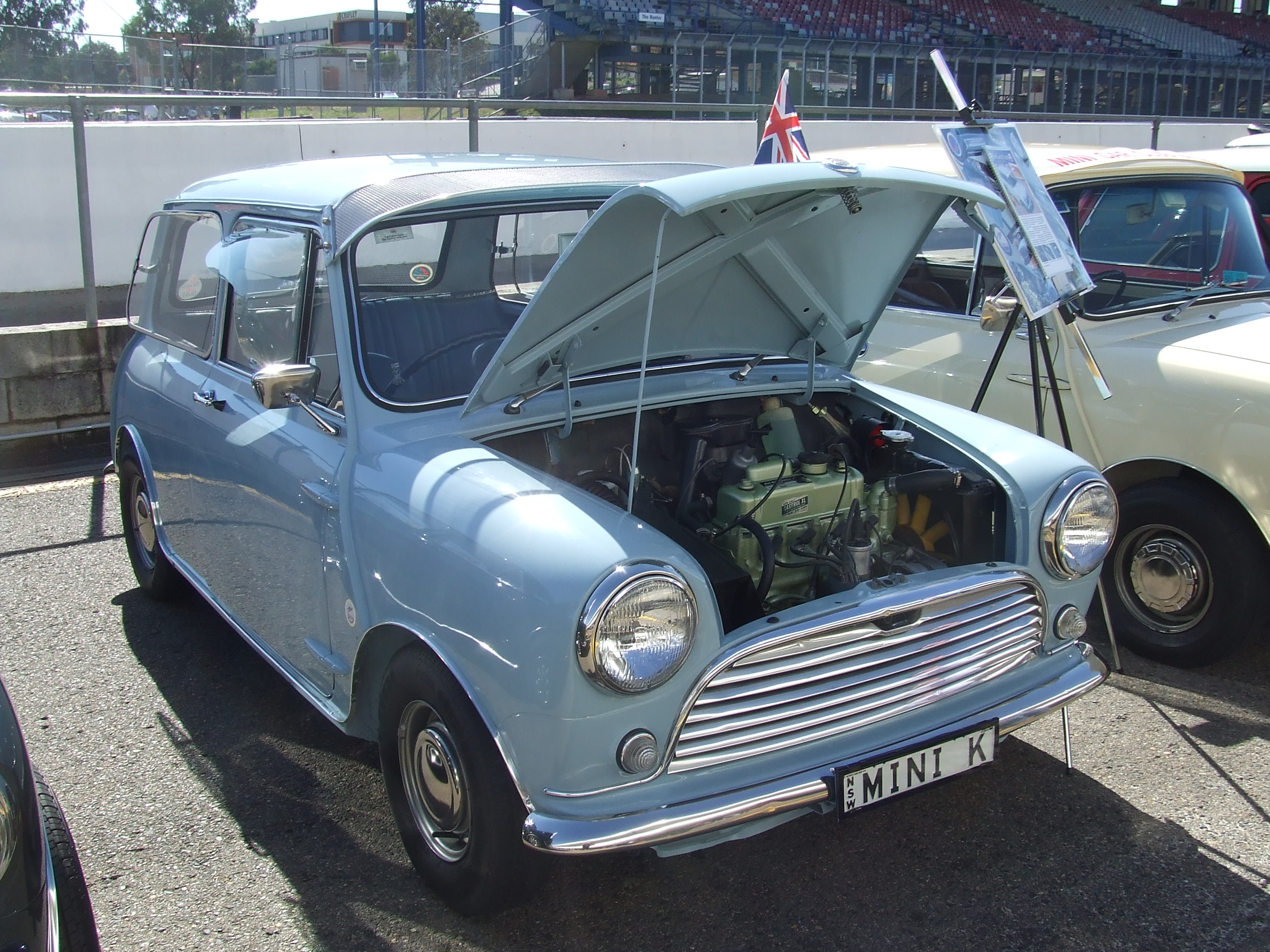
Morris Mini K

Built in the Australian British Motor Corporation factory at Zetland, New South Wales, using 80% local content, the Morris Mini K was advertised as the "great leap forward". The Mini K ('K' standing for Kangaroo) had a 1098 cc engine and was the last round-nosed model to be produced in Australia, originally priced at A$1780. The Mini K was offered in 2-door saloon and 2-door van body styles. It was distinctive in having wind-up windows and a swivelling quarterlight in Mk.I-style externally hinged doors. A small round sticker with a kangaroo logo was placed on the triangular panel between the door and the front body seam. The "Kangaroo" name was supposedly coined because it is claimed that a kangaroo can go all day without drinking which the advertisers used to emphasise the frugal fuel consumption and, possibly, larger fuel tank.

=== Mini Beach (1961–1962) ===
The Mini Beach cars were built by the British Motor Corporation for hotels and high end customers as a promotional tool from 1961 to 1962. Approximately 15 Beach Minis were built out of 20 planned by BMC back in the day, making it among the rarest factory Minis and wildly valuable today. One sold through Bonhams for $181,500 in 2014, and another changed hands on Bring a Trailer in 2019 for the remarkable sum of $230,000. Original Beach Minis were powered by the early Mini's 848 cc A-series motor. The Mini Beach cars were built by hand in house at Longbridge's Experimental Department. They had no doors, no B-pillars, and a spot-welded roof. The seats were similar to a Fiat 500 Jolly and originally made of wicker. An extremely rare booted concept version was made to look more balanced, but few survive today.

== Mini Cooper and Cooper S: 1961–1971; 1990–2000 ==
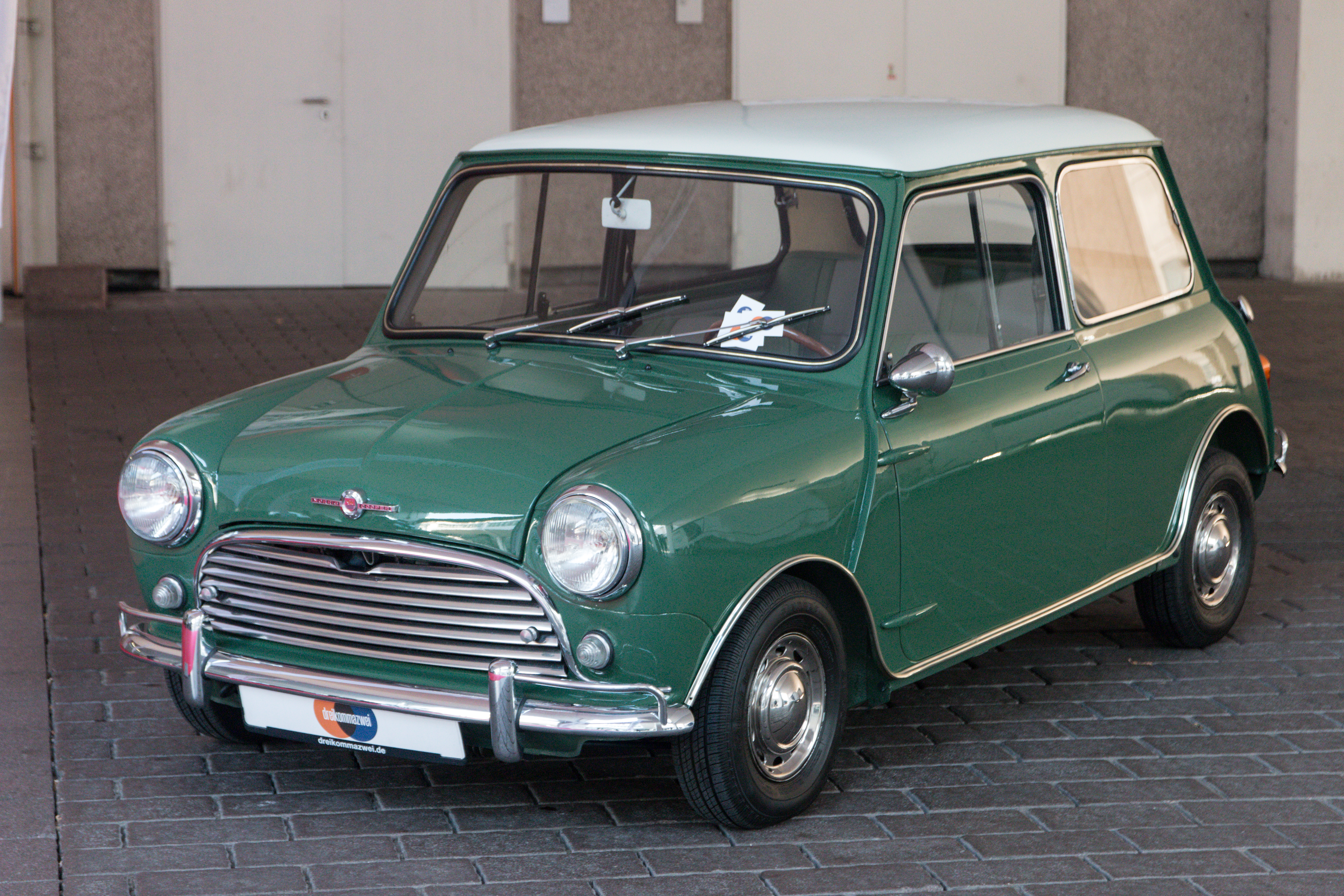
Morris Mini Cooper Mark I

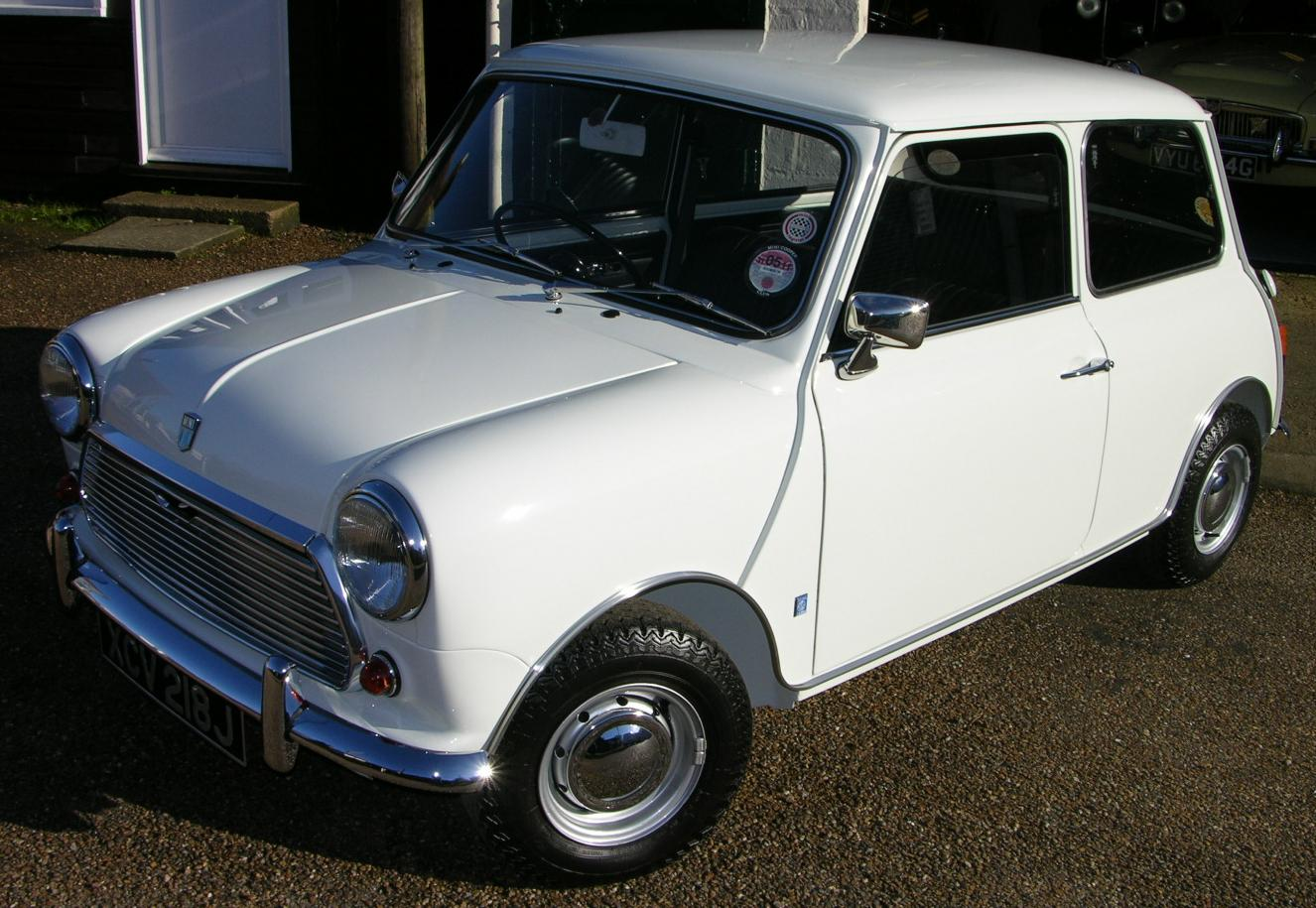
1971 Mini Cooper S Mk III

Issigonis' friend John Cooper, owner of the Cooper Car Company and designer and builder of Formula One cars, saw the potential of the Mini for competition. Issigonis was initially reluctant to see the Mini in the role of a performance car, but after John Cooper appealed to BMC management, the two men collaborated to create the Mini Cooper. The Austin Mini Cooper and Morris Mini Cooper debuted in September 1961.

The 848 cc (51.7 cu in) engine from the Morris Mini-Minor was given a longer stroke to increase capacity to 997 cc (60.8 cu in) increasing power from 34 to 55 bhp (25 to 41 kW). The car featured a race-tuned engine, twin SU carburettors, a closer-ratio gearbox and front disc brakes, uncommon at the time in a small car. One thousand units of this version were commissioned by management, intended for and designed to meet the homologation rules of Group 2 rally racing. The 997 cc engine was replaced by a shorter-stroke 998 cc unit in 1964. In 1962, Rhodesian John Love became the first non-British racing driver to win the British Saloon Car Championship driving a Mini Cooper.

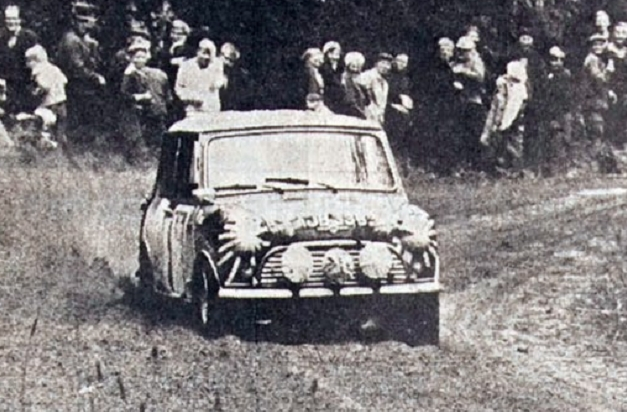
Timo Mäkinen and his Mini Cooper S on their way to the first of a hat-trick of wins in the 1000 Lakes Rally in Finland

A more powerful Mini Cooper, dubbed the "S", was developed in tandem and released in 1963. Featuring a 1,071 cc engine with a 70.61 mm bore and nitrided steel crankshaft, strengthened bottom end to allow further tuning, and larger servo-assisted disc brakes, 4,030 Cooper S cars were produced and sold until the model was updated in August 1964. Cooper also produced two S models specifically for circuit racing in the under-1,000 cc and under-1,300 cc classes, respectively. Rated at 970 cc (59 cu in) and a 1,275 cc (77.8 cu in), both had a 70.61 mm (2.780 in) bore and both were also offered to the public. From 1966 onwards Cooper S models featured twin fuel tanks as standard. The smaller-engine model was not well received, and only 963 had been built when the model was discontinued in 1965. The 1,275 cc Cooper S models continued in production until 1971.

Sales of the Mini Cooper were: 64,000 Mark I Coopers with 997 cc or 998 cc engines; 19,000 units of the Mark I Cooper S with 970 cc, 1,071 cc or 1,275 cc engines; 16,000 Mark II Coopers with 998 cc engines; and 6,300 units of the Mark II Cooper S with 1,275 cc engines. There were no Mark III Coopers, and 1,570 Mark III Cooper Ses.

An agreement between BMC and Innocenti was announced in 1959 to assemble BMC-manufactured cars for the Italian market. The first Mini Coopers assembled in Milan from imported knock-down kits with sales of the Innocenti Mini Cooper 1300 beginning in March 1966. It was licensed in 1973 to Spain's Authi (Automoviles de Turismo Hispano-Ingleses), which began to produce the Authi Mini Cooper 1300. The Cooper name was discontinued from the UK Mini range at this time.

A new Mini Cooper named the RSP (Rover Special Products) was briefly relaunched in 1990–91, with slightly lower performance than the 1960s Cooper. It proved popular, and a new Cooper-badged Mini went into full production in late 1991. To meet emission standards, Coopers from 1992 on were fitted with a fuel-injected version of the 1,275 cc engine, and in 1997 a multi-point fuel-injected engine was introduced, along with a front-mounted radiator and various safety improvements. "I love my Mini Cooper," remarked Madonna in 2003. "I was too scared to drive a big car in London."

== Mini Clubman and 1275 GT: 1969–1980 ==
Mini Clubman; Mini 1275 GT
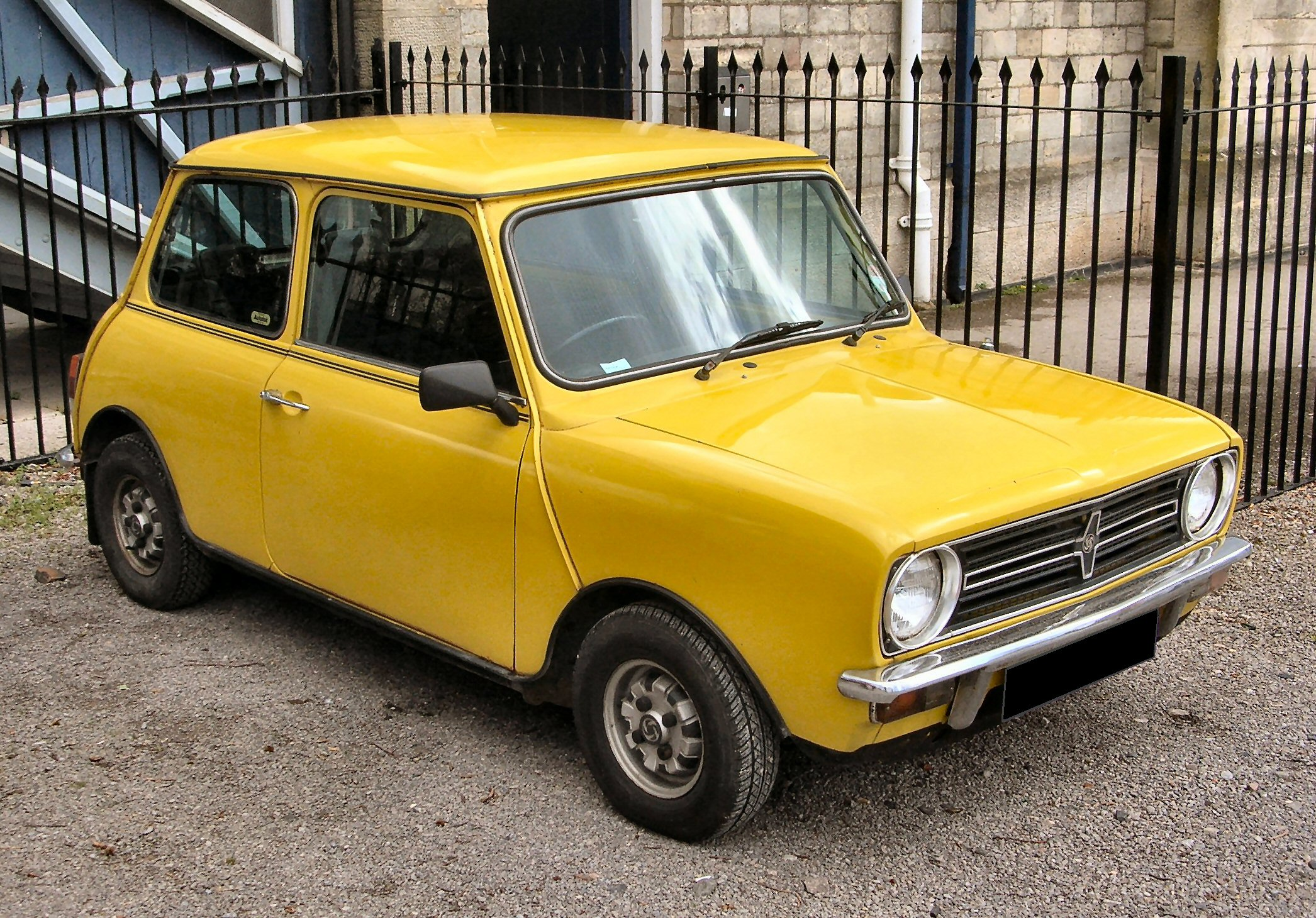
- 1980 Mini Clubman

Overview
- Also called: Morris Mini Clubman (Australia); Leyland Mini (Australia)
- Production: 1969–1980
- Assembly: United Kingdom: Longbridge, Birmingham (Longbridge plant); Portugal: Setúbal; New Zealand: Petone; Australia: Zetland

Body and chassis
- Body style: 2-door saloon; 2-door estate

Powertrain
- Engine: 1,098 cc (1.1 L) I4; 998 cc (1.0 L) I4; 1,275 cc (1.3 L) I4

Dimensions
- Length: saloon: 124 1/2 in (3.16 m) estate: 133.9 in (3.40 m)

In 1969, under the ownership of British Leyland, the Mini was given a facelift by stylist Roy Haynes, who had previously worked for Ford. The restyled version was called the Mini Clubman, and has a squarer front, protruding some 10 cm / 4in further forward, using the same indicator/sidelight assembly as the Austin Maxi. The Mini Clubman was intended to replace the upmarket Riley and Wolseley versions. At launch all Clubmans were powered by the 998 cc engine as already used in the Mini 1000, with 38 bhp. A more sporting model with the 1275 cc single-carburettor 59 bhp engine, dubbed the 1275 GT, was slated as the replacement for the 998 cc Mini Cooper (the 1,275 cc Mini Cooper S continued alongside the 1275 GT for two years until 1971). The Clubman Estate replaced the Countryman and Traveller. The original "round-front" design Mini remained in production alongside the Clubman and 1275 GT in 850 and 1000 forms as lower-priced models in the new Mini range.

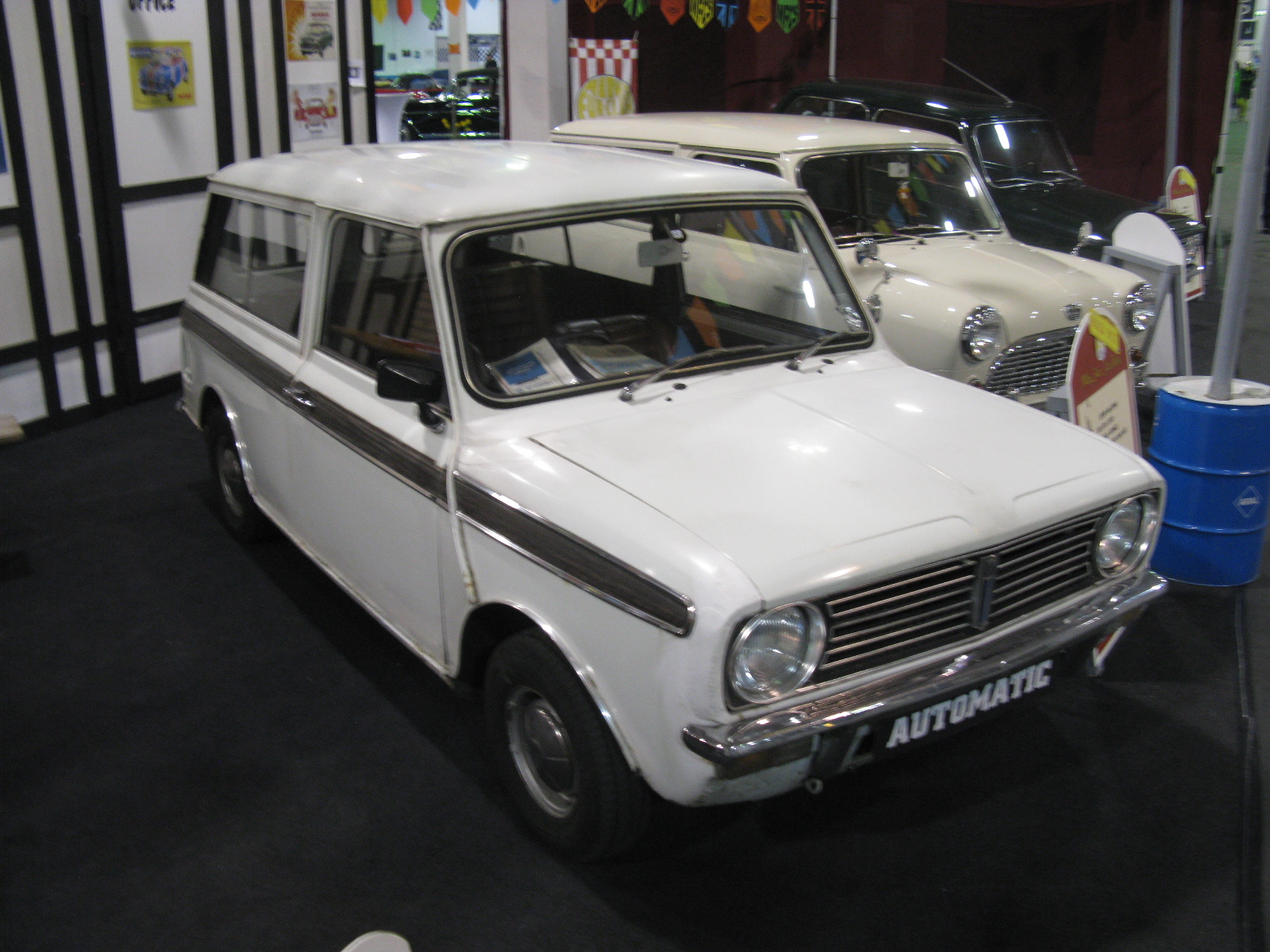
Mini Clubman Estate

Production of the Clubman and 1275 GT got off to a slow start because the cars incorporated "lots of production changes" including the relocation of tooling from the manufacturer's Cowley plant to the Longbridge plant: very few cars were handed over to customers before the early months of 1970.

Early domestic market Clubmans were still delivered on cross-ply tyres despite the fact that by 1970 radials had become the norm for the car's mainstream competitors. By 1973 new Minis were, by default, being shipped with radial tyres, though cross-plies could be specified by special order, giving British buyers a price saving of £8.

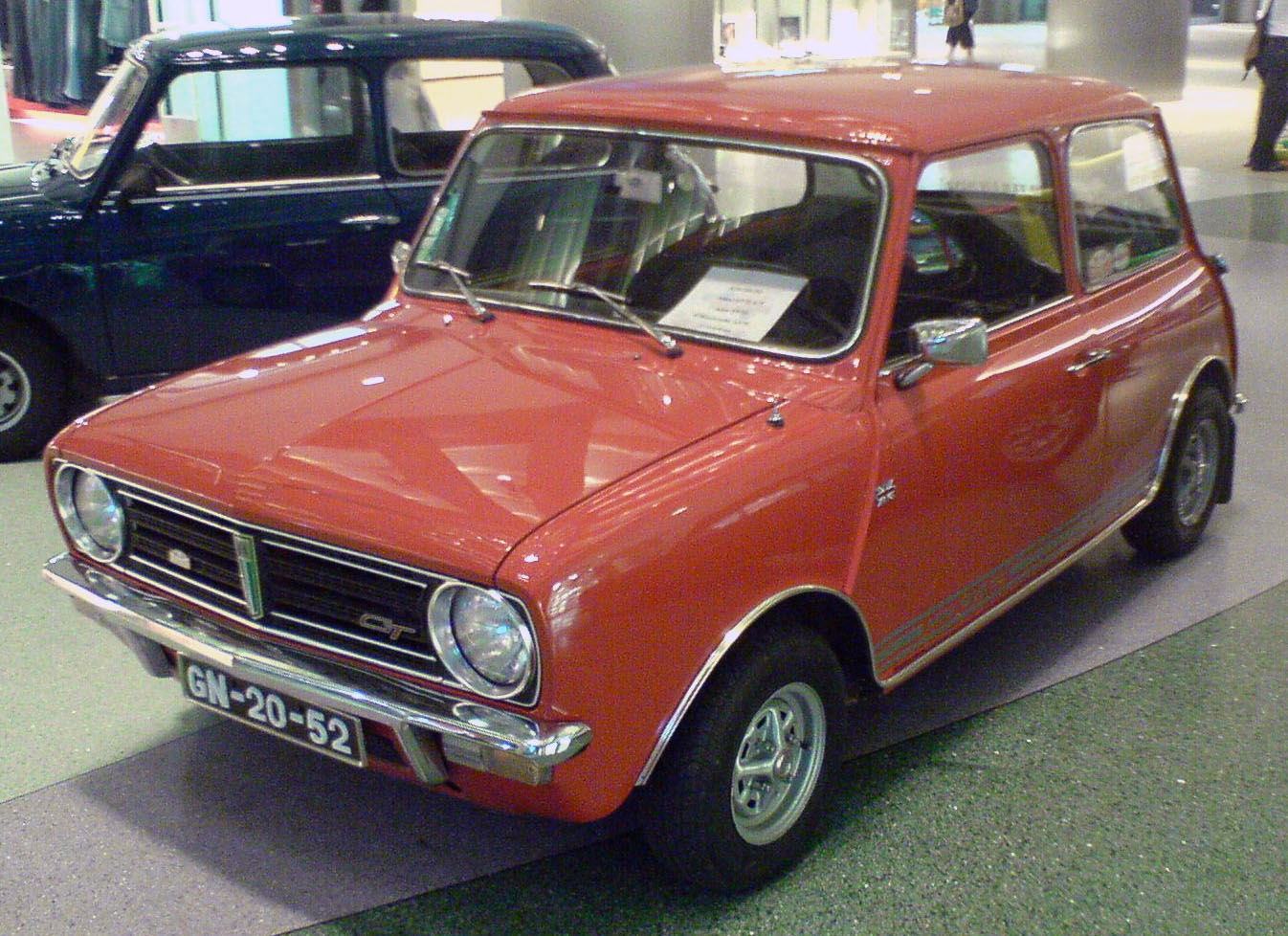
Mini 1275 GT

The 1275 GT is often incorrectly described as the "Mini Clubman 1275 GT". The official name was always just the "Mini 1275 GT", and it was a separate, distinct model from the Clubman (although it shared the same frontal treatment as the Mini Clubman, and was launched at the same time).

In 1971, the 1,275 cc Mini Cooper S was discontinued in the UK, leaving the Mini 1275 GT as the only sporting Mini on sale for the rest of the decade. Innocenti in Italy, however, continued making their own version of the Mini Cooper for some time. While the UK-built 1275 GT was not nearly as quick as a 1275 Mini Cooper S, it was cheaper to buy, run, and insure. It was the first Mini to be equipped with a tachometer. It also featured a standard-fit close-ratio gearbox, and initially had 10-inch (25.4 cm) Rostyle wheels covering the 7.5-inch (19.05 cm) Cooper S type disc brakes, and a boot board; both were dropped in 1974. Performance of the 1275GT was lively for the time, achieving 0–60 mph (0–97 km/h) in 12.9 seconds, and the excellent mid-range torque offered a 30–50 mph (48–80 km/h) time in top gear of only nine seconds. The bluff front, however, meant that the model struggled to reach 90 mph (140 km/h).

From 1975 the standard Clubman and Clubman Estate received the 1098 cc engine (as also fitted to the Austin Allegro) with 45 bhp, although Clubmans with the AP automatic transmission retained the less powerful 998 cc power unit.

Throughout the 1970s, British Leyland continued to produce the classic 1959 "round-front" design, alongside the newer Clubman and 1275 GT models. The long-nose Clubman and 1275 GT offered better crash safety, were better equipped, and had better under-bonnet access, but they were more expensive and aerodynamically inferior to the original 1959 design. The Mini Clubman and 1275 GT were replaced in 1980 by the new hatchback Austin Metro, while production of the original "round-front" Mini design continued for another 20 years. At the end of Clubman and 1275 GT production, 275,583 Clubman saloons, 197,606 Clubman Estates and 110,673 1275 GTs had been made.

=== Australia ===
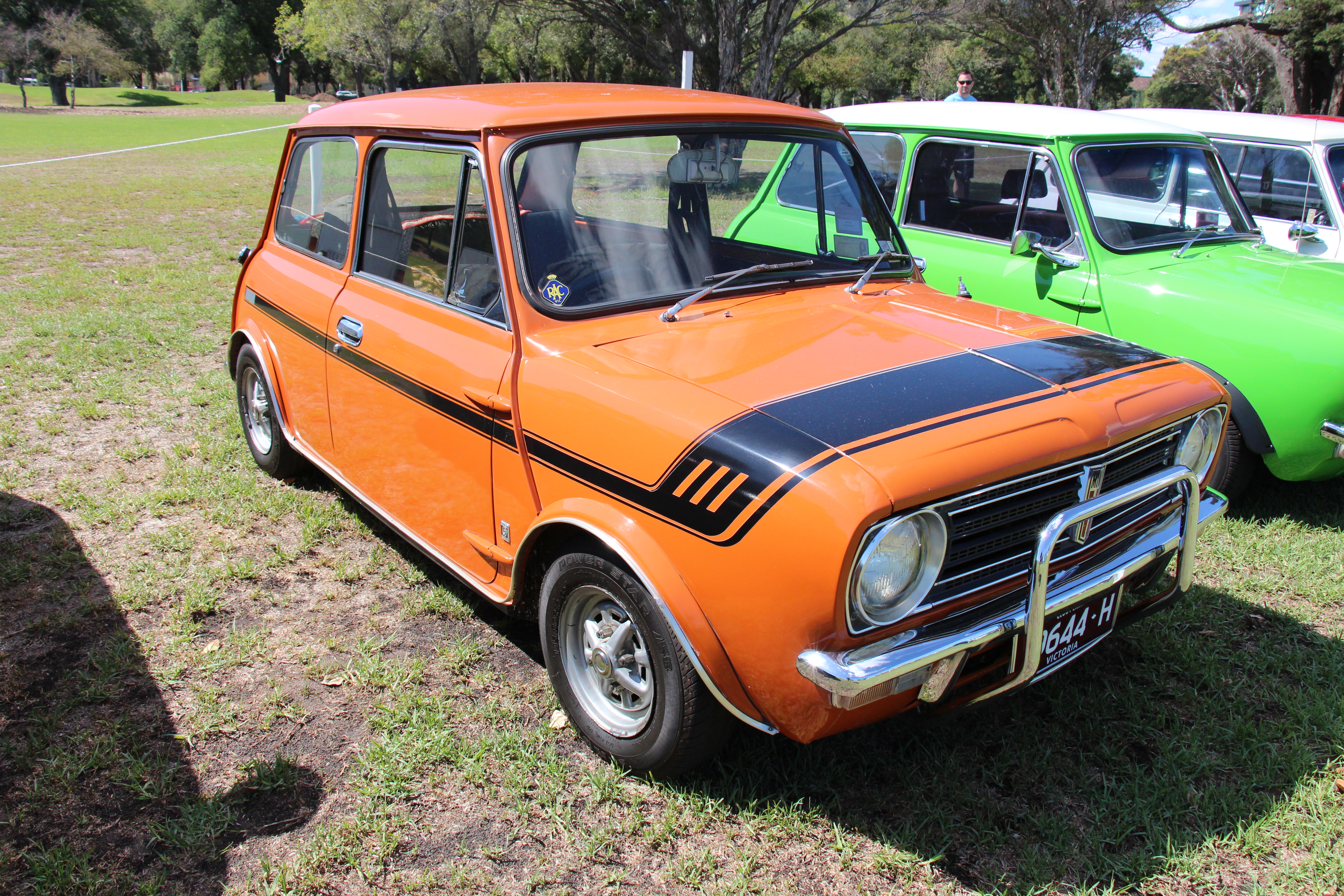
1971–1972 Morris Mini Clubman GT

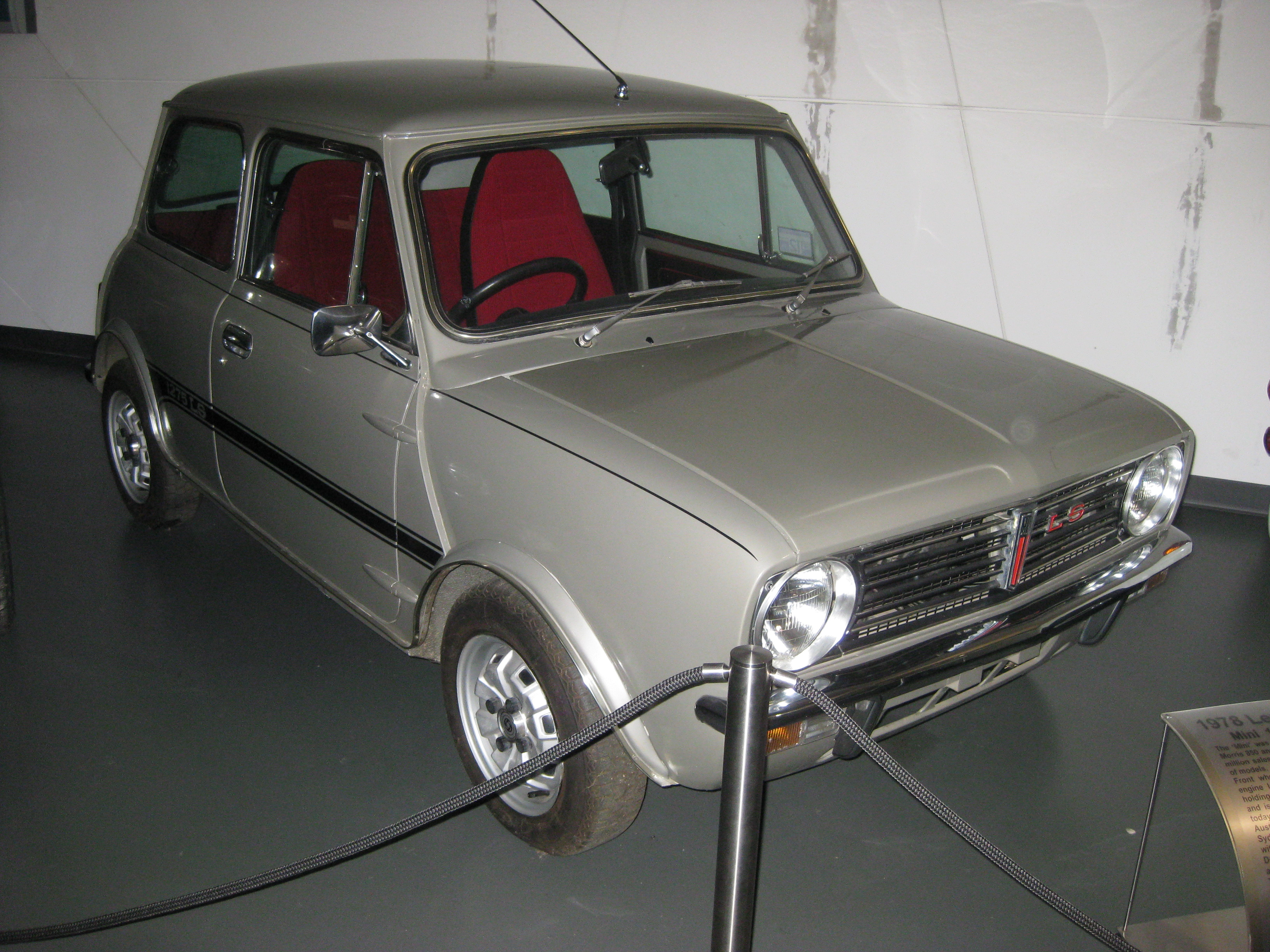
The Leyland Mini LS was produced by Leyland Australia from 1977 to 1978

For the Australian market, all Minis including the Van gained the Clubman front in 1971 although the car was still basically a Mk I behind the A-Pillar. The Australian van thus became the only Clubman Van produced anywhere in the world. From mid-1971 to the end of 1972, a Clubman GT version of the saloon was produced. This was essentially a Cooper S in Clubman body, equipped with the same 7.5-inch (190 mm) disc brakes, twin fuel tanks, and twin-carburettor Cooper S 1,275 cc engine. Australian Clubman saloons were marketed under the Morris Mini Clubman name when introduced in August 1971, and as the Leyland Mini, without the Clubman name, from February 1973.

To end Mini production in Australia, a limited-edition runout model was produced – the 1275LS. Fitted with a pollution control 1,275 cc engine sourced from Europe, the LS had a single 1.5-inch (38 mm) carburettor and 8.4-inch (210 mm) disc brakes. Production of this model commenced in July 1978 and concluded in October 1978 with an approximate total of 810 vehicles produced.

== End of production ==
Throughout the 1980s and 1990s the British market received numerous "special editions" of the Mini, which shifted the car from a mass-market item into a fashionable icon. It was this image that perhaps helped the Mini become such an asset for BMW, which later bought the remnants of BMC as the Rover Group. It was even more popular in Japan, which took the lion's share of the circa 40,000 Minis produced annually in the early 1990s. It was seen there as a retro-cool icon, and inspired many imitators. The ERA Mini Turbo was particularly popular with Japanese buyers.

In 1994, under Bernd Pischetsrieder, a first cousin once removed of Issigonis, BMW took control of the Rover Group, owner of the Rover, MG, Mini and Land Rover brands. At this time, Mini models gained an airbag to comply with European legislation.

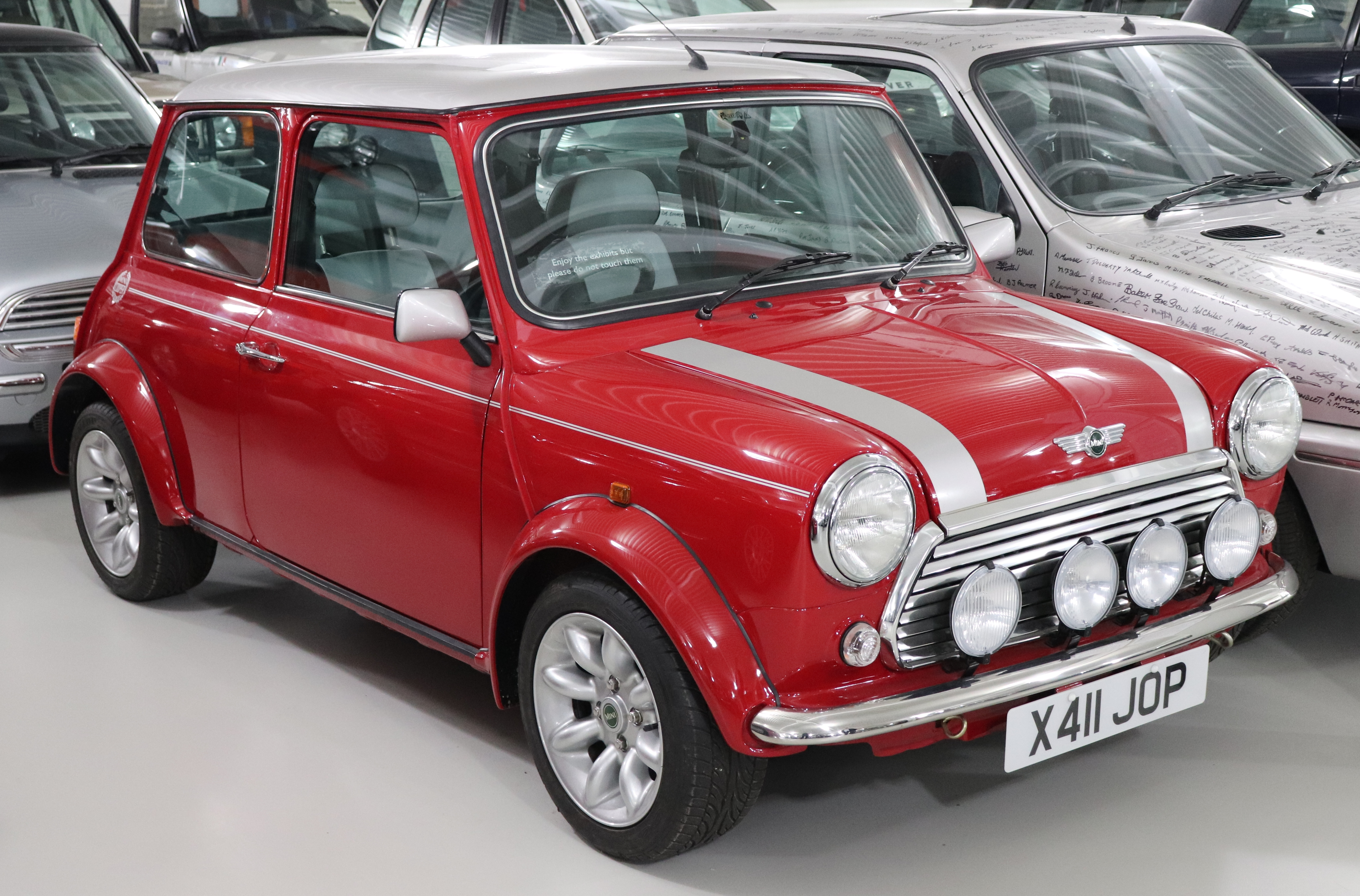
The last Mini produced, a Rover Cooper Mini Sport, rolled off the Longbridge line on 4 October 2000

By March 2000, Rover was still suffering massive losses, and BMW decided to dispose of most of the companies. The sell-off was completed in May that year. MG and Rover went to Phoenix, a new British consortium; and Land Rover was sold to US Carmaker Ford Motor Company. BMW retained the Mini name and planned a new model, granting Rover temporary rights to the brand and allowing it to manufacture and sell the run-out model of the old Mini. By April 2000, the range consisted of four versions: the Mini Classic Seven, the Mini Classic Cooper, the Mini Classic Cooper Sport and—for overseas European markets—the Mini Knightsbridge. The last Mini (a red Cooper Sport) was built on 4 October 2000 and presented to the British Motor Industry Heritage Trust in December of that year. A total of 5,387,862 cars had been manufactured, nearly 1.6 million of which were sold in the UK, although the majority of these were sold at least 20 years before the Mini's demise, meaning that the majority of those sold had been scrapped before the end of the original Mini's production life.

After the last of the Mini production had been sold, the 'Mini' name passed to BMW ownership in October 2000. Mini Hatch, the new model made by BMW, is technically unrelated to the old car but retains the classic transverse four-cylinder, front-wheel-drive configuration and "bulldog" stance of the original.

The last Mini to leave the Longbridge plant did so in 2012, when a 1970s 1275GT which was used by staff to travel around the car plant was recovered from the disused tunnels under the plant. The car was damaged by a storage container falling on it and had been left without an engine or gearbox for around 30 years before being recovered during work to infill the tunnels. This car was sold at auction in July 2013 for £1400.

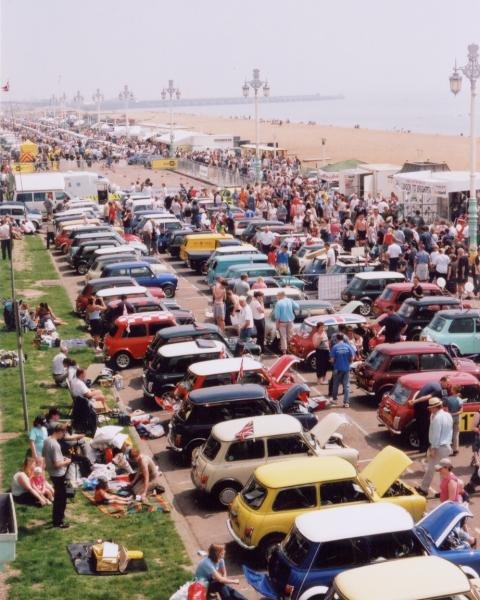
Minis lined up on Brighton seafront after a London-to-Brighton rally

== Timeline ==
- August 1959: Introduction of the Austin Seven, Morris Mini-Minor and Morris Mini-Minor DL 2-door saloons, all with transversely mounted 848 cc engine and 4-speed manual gearbox
- 1960: Introduction of the Austin Seven Countryman and Morris Mini-Minor Traveller 3-door estates, both with 848 cc engine from the saloon models. 116,667 cars built in the first full year of production.
- 1961: Introduction of the Austin Seven Super and Morris Mini-Minor Super 2-door saloons
- 1961: Introduction of the Austin Mini Cooper and Morris Mini Cooper 2-door saloon, both with larger 997 cc 55 bhp (41 kW) engine
- October 1961: Introduction of Riley Elf and Wolseley Hornet variants
- January 1962: All former Austin Seven models now officially called Austin Mini.
- March 1962: pvc seat covers replaced cloth upholstery on entry-level model ("basic Mini").
- 1962: "De Luxe" and "Super" designations discontinued. "Super de Luxe" designation introduced. Modified instrument panel now included oil pressure and water temperature gauges.
- March 1963: Introduction of the Austin Mini Cooper 1071 S and Morris Mini Cooper 1071 S 2-door saloons, both with larger 1071 cc 70 bhp (52 kW) engine
- 1964: Introduction of the Mini Moke
- April 1964: Introduction of the Austin and Morris Mini-Cooper 998, Mini-Cooper 970 S and Mini-Cooper 1275 S. 1275 S models have 1275 cc 76 bhp (57 kW) engine. Automatic transmission available as an option for the 998 cc Austin Mini-Cooper 998 and 1275 S. Previous Mini-Cooper 997 and 1071 S models dropped.
- 1965: Mini Cooper 970 S discontinued
- October 1965: Automatic transmission now available as an option on standard Austin/Morris Mini and Morris Mini SDL
- October 1967: Mark 2 range launched with facelift and upgraded equipment. Austin Mini range as follows: 850, 1000, Cooper 998 and Cooper 1275 S 2-door saloons and 1000 Countryman 3-door estate. Morris Mini range as follows: 850, 850 SDL, 1000 SDL, Cooper 998 and Cooper 1275 S 2-door saloons and 1000 Traveller 3-door estate. Optional automatic transmission available on all Austin models (except 850) and Morris Mini 1000 SDL saloon.
- September 1968: Manual four speed gear box with synchromesh on all four forward ratios introduced
- March 1969: Launch of the Morris Mini K, an Australian-only model manufactured in the Australian British Motor Corporation factory at Zetland NSW using 80% local content
- August 1969: Riley Elf and Wolseley Hornet variants discontinued
- October 1969: Separate Austin and Morris badging now merged into Mini 850/Mini 1000 badging. Range reduced to: 850, 1000, Clubman, Cooper S and 1275 GT 2-door saloon and Clubman 3-door estate. Optional automatic transmission available on all except 1275 GT.
- Late 1969: The Mini MK3 is introduced in South Africa. The MK3 combined the booted rear of the Riley Elf / Wolseley Hornet with the standard rounded front of the ADO15 Mini.
- 1980: The Mini becomes the Austin Mini.
- 1988: The Mini becomes a marque in its own right, although V5 documents often show "Rover" as the marque, this is incorrect.
- January 1994 : BMW acquires the Rover Group, owner of the Rover, MG, Mini and Land Rover brands.
- March 2000 : BMW sales of the other brands of the Rover Group except Mini.
- October 2000: Mini production ends at Longbridge Plant and the Mini name is transferred to BMW.

== Limited editions ==
From the Mark IV onward, many special limited-production editions of the Mini were offered. These included models that were created to commemorate racing victories or to celebrate an anniversary of the Mini marque. Limited editions generally came equipped with a unique combination of interior and exterior trim and special decals. Examples include Mini 1100 Special, Mini 1000 Special HL (only available in silver colour with black vinyl roof, black cloth upholstery seats with head restraints and walnut interior trim, for Portugal market only), Mini Rio, Mini Mayfair, Mini Park Lane, Mini Cooper RSP, Mini Flame, Mini Red Hot, Mini Jet Black, Mini Racing, Mini Thirty (30) which 3000 examples were produced, 2000 in Red and 1000 in Black and the Mini Monza. There was also a version inspired by The Italian Job, a 1969 film famous for having a trio of Minis in its epic closing car chase.

== Concepts and unproduced prototypes ==
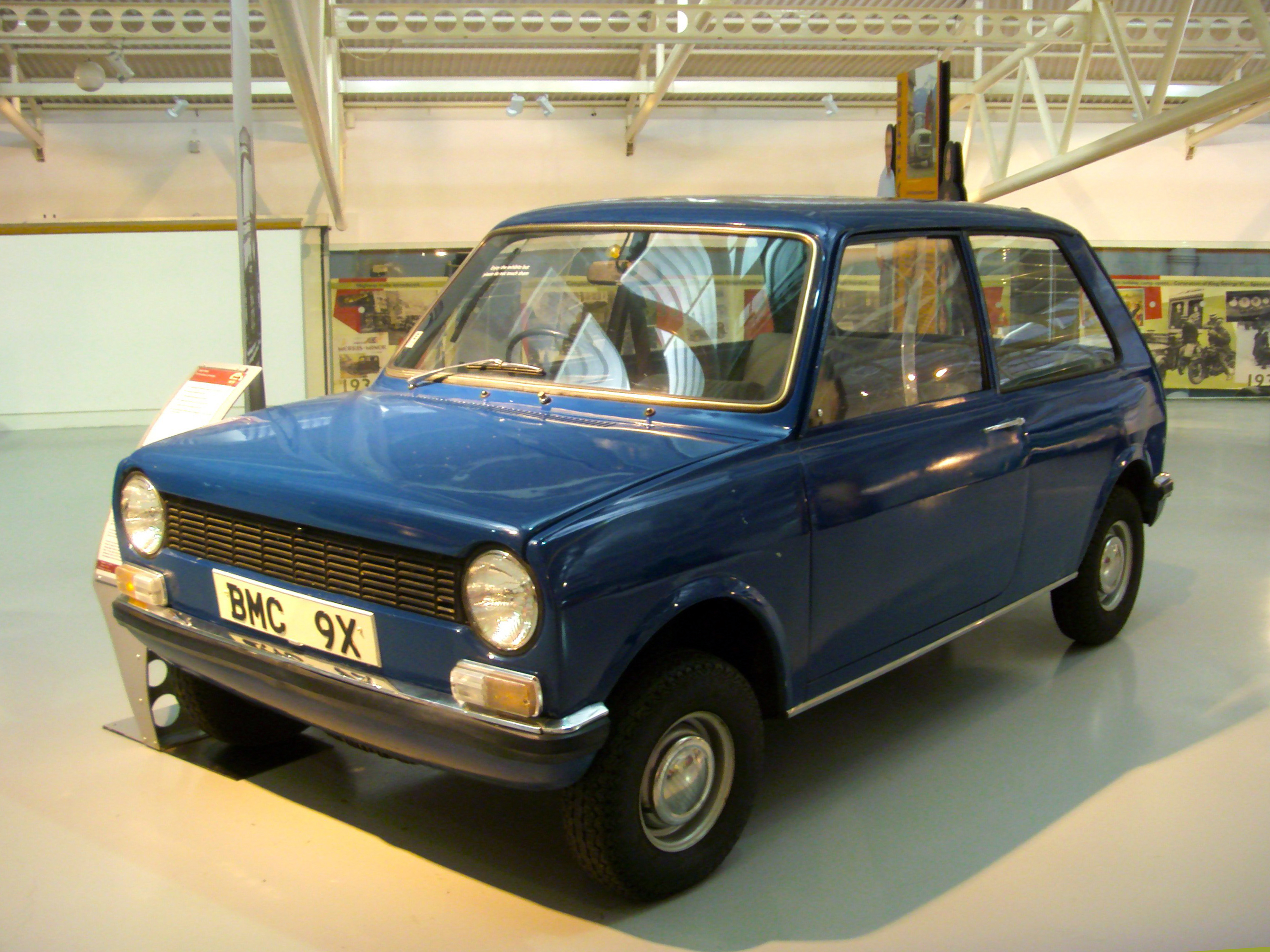
Mini 9X at the Heritage Motor Centre

From 1967 to 1979, Issigonis had been designing a replacement for the Mini in the form of an experimental model called the 9X. It was even shorter (9 ft 8 in (2.95 m)) and yet still a bit roomier. (Note: Making it 2cm shorter than the Fiat 500, but still 5cm longer than the BMW 600.) It was designed as a hatchback, and Issigonis designed an all new engine, 50% more powerful than the Mini's, but due to politicking inside British Leyland (which had now been formed by the merger of BMC's parent company British Motor Holdings and the Leyland Motor Corporation), the car repeatedly fell victim to other corporate priorities.

A number of prototypes produced for vehicles based on the Mini but which never saw production are held and sometimes displayed at the British Heritage Motor Centre museum at Gaydon, Warwickshire. These included the Twini, a re-engineered four-wheel-drive Moke with two engines—one at the front and another at the back; the Austin Ant, a second attempt to produce a four-wheel-drive vehicle, this time using a transfer case; and a two-seater convertible MG edition of the Mini known as ADO34, cancelled due to it being perceived as competition for the MG Midget.

In 1992, a project considering possible improvements to the Mini was started. Codenamed Minki ("Mini" plus K-Series engine), it included a redesigned dashboard, a two-piece rear door or tailgate instead of a boot, fold down rear seats, Hydragas suspension and a 3-cylinder version of the K-Series engine with a 5-speed gearbox. However, the project was cancelled by management within Rover, who decided that the cost of engineering the changes, and achieving compliance with modern crash testing standards, was too great for the production volumes that could be expected of an updated Mini.

In 1995 the idea to update the Mini again surfaced but this time with BMW management. As part of the process of deciding how to replace the Mini, a vehicle representing what the current Mini could have become, if it had been developed further over its production history, was commissioned. This resulted in the Minki-II, designed to house the 1.4L MPI K-Series engine with an extensive redesign inside, but without the original Minki's tailgate. The car had to be widened by 50mm and lengthened by 50mm to accommodate the new engine and gearbox, with Hydragas suspension and dashboard from a Rover 100. The Minki-II was used for Hydragas development work, this suspension being considered at the time for the R59 project, later to become the Mini Hatch.

== Kit cars and customisation ==
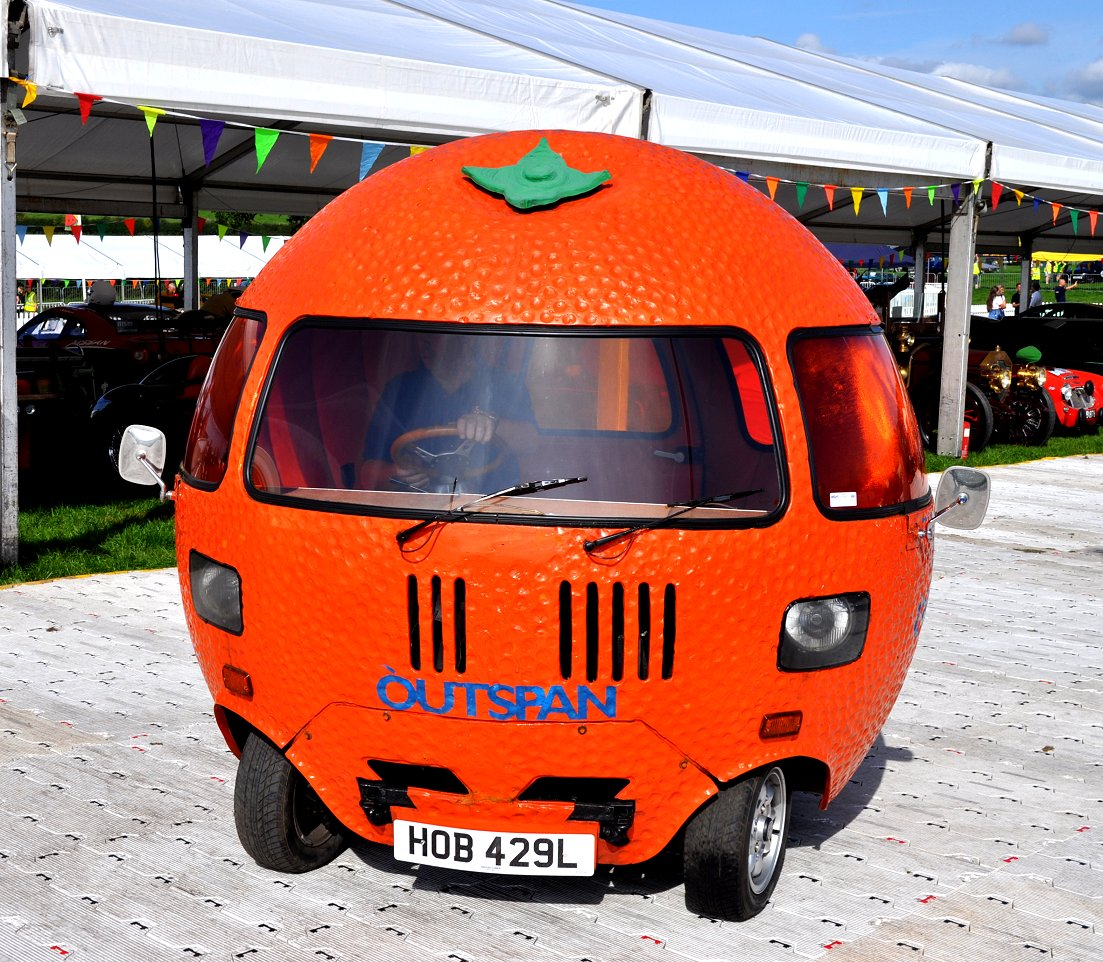
One of three Outspan Orange Minis, at Carfest South in 2017

The cheapness and availability of used Minis make it a candidate for body replacement. There are over 120 Mini-based kit cars from various small companies and individual enthusiasts.

The Outspan Orange is probably one of the most unusual. It was designed and built by Brian Waite Enterprises of Bodiam, East Sussex in 1972 to promote fruit. Several still survive.

== Motorsport ==
BMC operated a Competition Department at Abingdon, Oxfordshire, under the control of Stuart Turner, which built specially prepared Minis (mostly based on Cooper and Cooper S versions) to compete in international rallies and other motorsport. This department played a key role in ensuring the Mini's huge success in motorsport throughout the 1960s, in particular, winning the Monte Carlo Rally in 1964, 1965 and 1967, the 1000 Lakes Rally in 1965, 1966 and 1967, and dominating all of the first 9 positions in the 1966 Gallaher 500 at Bathurst.

The car also won the 1961, 1962, 1969, 1978 and 1979 British Saloon Car Championship season, as well as the British Rally Championship in 1962, 1963 and 1970, the European Rally Championship in 1965 and 1966, and won the Finnish Rally Championship in 1965 and 1966. Minis also won the 1965 Lowood 4 Hour endurance race, and the final Finnish Grand Prix in 1963. The Cooper S also had some success in the European Touring Car Championship, winning in 1964 and 1968, the Guia Race of Macau (a 1-2-3 finish in 1965, a 1–2 finish in 1970 and a win in 1972), and the Australian Touring Car Championship, winning its class in 1962, 1963, 1964, 1966, 1967 and 1968. A further title was the 1971 Sun-7 Chesterfield Series. The Mini also achieved class wins at the 1963 Armstrong 500, repeating this feat every year until 1969, and having class wins at the 1964, 1965 and 1971 Sandown 250, and Six Hour Le Mans in 1963, 1964, 1965, 1966, 1967, 1968, 1969, 1970 and 1972, as well as the 1971 Phillip Island 500K. The car also won the Welsh Sports and Saloon Car Championship in 1998. Mini Leyland came 4th place in the under-2-litre category in the 1966, 1967 and 1969 Trans-Am seasons, improving to 3rd in 1970.

The Mini Cooper S won the Monte Carlo Rally in 1964, 1965 and 1967. Minis initially placed first, second and third in the 1966 rally as well, but were disqualified after a controversial decision by the judges. The disqualification related to the use of a variable resistance headlamp dimming circuit in place of a dual-filament lamp. Fourth placed Roger Clark's Ford Cortina was disqualified for the same reason, along with six other cars. The fifth car past the finishing line, a Citroën DS, a model that had won the race previously, was awarded first place – the DS had similar headlamps, but these were standard production equipment on the car – in line with the letter of the rules. The driver of the Citroën, Pauli Toivonen, felt that he had not really "won" the rally. BMC probably received more publicity from the disqualification than they would have gained from a victory.

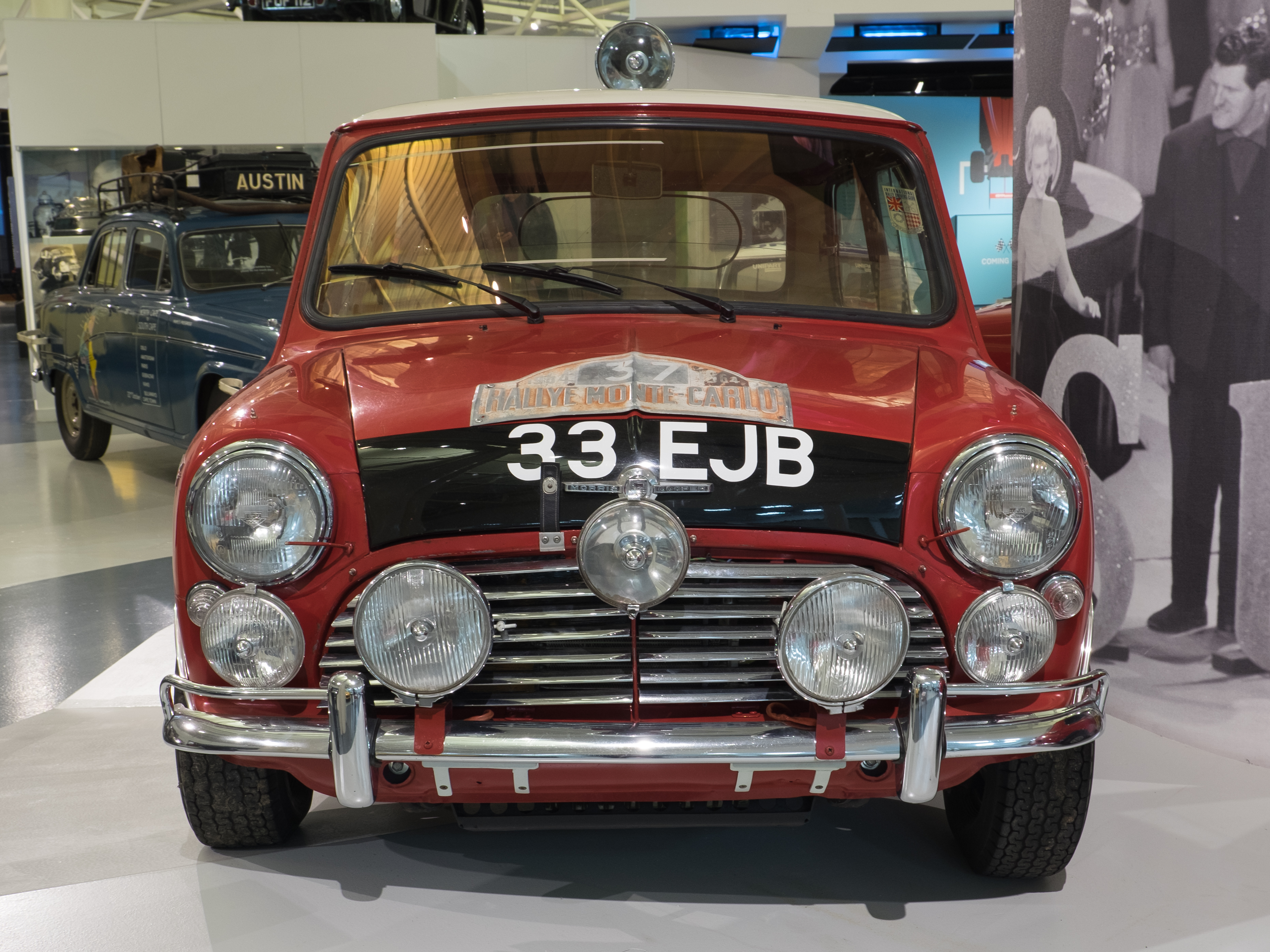
1964 Monte Carlo Rally winner: 1963 Morris Mini Cooper S

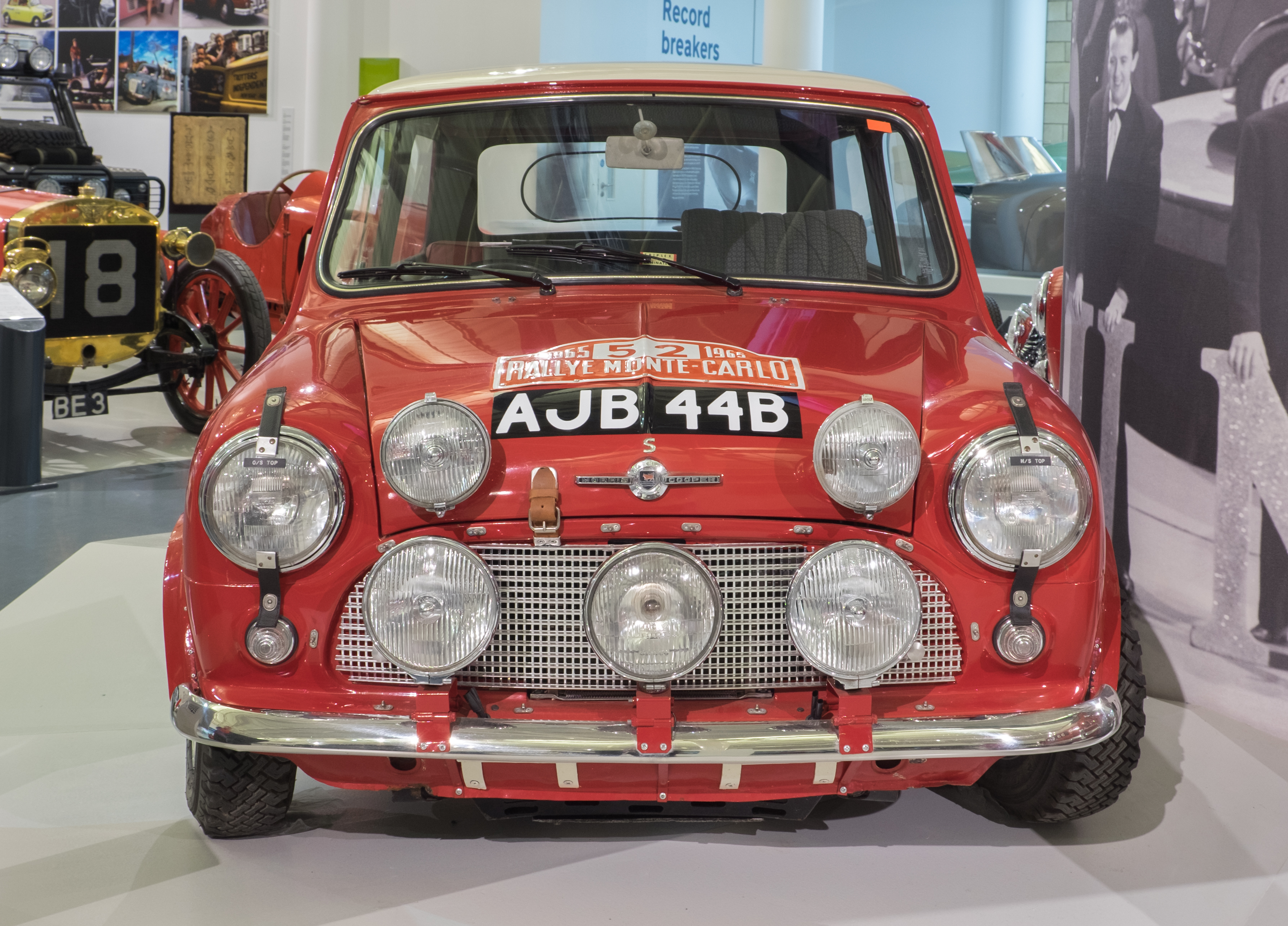
1965 Monte Carlo Rally winner: 1964 Morris Mini Cooper S

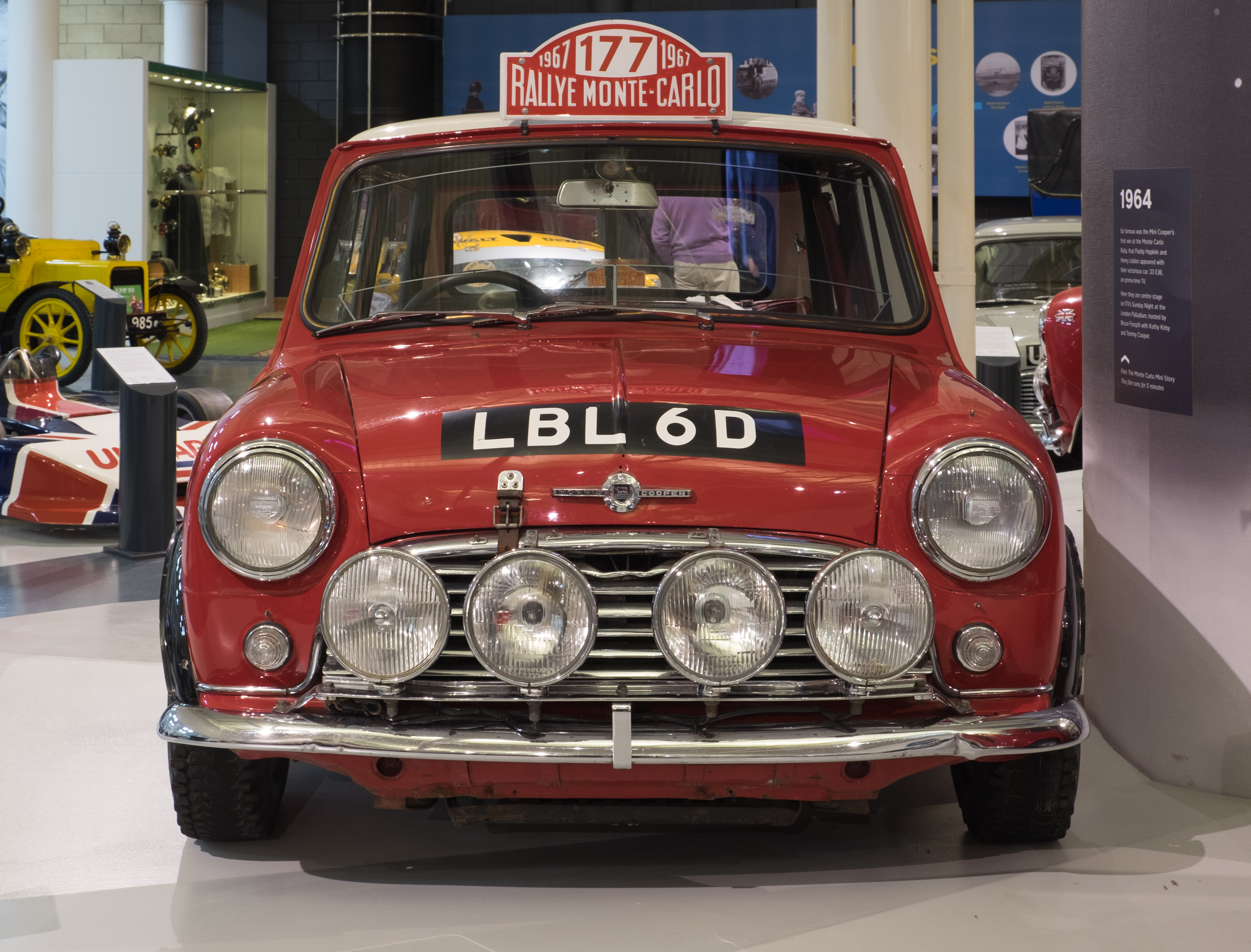
1967 Monte Carlo Rally winner: 1966 Morris Mini Cooper S

Monte Carlo Rally results for Mini
Year	Driver	Co-driver	Result
1962	Pat Moss	Ann Wisdom	Ladies' Award
1963	Rauno Aaltonen	Tony Ambrose	3rd
1964	Paddy Hopkirk	Henry Liddon	Winner
1964	Timo Mäkinen	Patrick Vanson	4th
1965	Timo Mäkinen	Paul Easter	Winner
1966	Timo Mäkinen	Paul Easter	(disqualified)
1966	Rauno Aaltonen	Tony Ambrose	(disqualified)
1966	Paddy Hopkirk	Henry Liddon	(disqualified)
1967	Rauno Aaltonen	Henry Liddon	Winner
1968	Rauno Aaltonen	Henry Liddon	3rd
1968	Tony Fall	Mike Wood	4th
1968	Paddy Hopkirk	Ron Crellin	5th

In rallycross, the Mini finished on the podium in the first ever race, at Lydden Hill Race Circuit in February 1967, winning races in the FIA European Rallycross Championship in 1974 and 1975. The car competed as late as the 1979 Australian Rallycross Championship.

The Se7ens is the UK's longest running one make motor racing championship, having been introduced in 1966. As of 2014, classic Minis are still raced, with other one make races in the UK, Europe and Asia, and in classic events such as the Goodwood Members Meeting. In 2012 a Mini broke the land speed record. A Mini was used to set a record at the Chateau Impney Hill Climb.

=== International Rally victories ===
Season	Event	Driver
1960	(Republic of Ireland) Cork 20 Rally	(Republic of Ireland) Sheila O'Clery
1962	(Northern Ireland) Circuit of Ireland Rally	(Northern Ireland) Paddy Hopkirk
1962	(Netherlands) Tulip Rally	(United Kingdom) Pat Moss
1962	Rally Sweden	(Sweden) Bengt Söderström
1962	(Germany) Rallye de Baden-Baden	(United Kingdom) Pat Moss
1964	(Monaco) Monte Carlo Rally	(Northern Ireland) Paddy Hopkirk
1964	Rally Isle of Man	(United Kingdom) Dave Friswell
1964	(Netherlands) Tulip Rally	(Finland) Timo Mäkinen
1964	(Republic of Ireland) Cork 20 Rally	(Republic of Ireland) Paul O'Flynn
1965	(Monaco) Monte Carlo Rally	(Finland) Timo Mäkinen
1965	(Finland) 1000 Lakes Rally	(Finland) Timo Mäkinen
1965	Belgium Ypres Westhoek Rally	(Belgium) Jean Pierre Vandermeersch
1965	(Northern Ireland) Circuit of Ireland Rally	(Northern Ireland) Paddy Hopkirk
1965	Rally Poland	(Finland) Rauno Aaltonen
1965	(United Kingdom) RAC Rally	(Finland) Rauno Aaltonen
1965	Rally Isle of Man	(United Kingdom) Tony Fall
1965	Rallye International de Madagascar	(France) Duclos
1966	(Finland) 1000 Lakes Rally	(Finland) Timo Mäkinen
1966	(Northern Ireland) Circuit of Ireland Rally	(United Kingdom) Tony Fall
1966	Rally Poland	(United Kingdom) Tony Fall
1966	(Scotland) Scottish Rally	(United Kingdom) Tony Fall
1966	(Netherlands) Tulip Rally	(Finland) Rauno Aaltonen
1966	Rallye International de Madagascar	(Madagascar) Ramaroson
1966	(Hungary) Munich-Vienna-Budapest	(Finland) Timo Mäkinen
1967	(Monaco) Monte Carlo Rally	(Finland) Rauno Aaltonen
1967	(Finland) 1000 Lakes Rally	(Finland) Timo Mäkinen
1967	(Greece) Acropolis Rally	(Northern Ireland) Paddy Hopkirk
1967	(Northern Ireland) Circuit of Ireland Rally	(Northern Ireland) Paddy Hopkirk
1967	Rally Isle of Man	(United Kingdom) Norman Harvey
1967	(France) Alpine Rally	(Northern Ireland) Paddy Hopkirk
1967	(Switzerland) Geneva Rally	(United Kingdom) Tony Fall
1972	Rally New Zealand	(United Kingdom) Andrew Cowan

=== British Saloon Car Championship titles ===
Season	Driver	Wins	Points
1961	(England) John Whitmore	3	53
1962	(Federation of Rhodesia and Nyasaland) John Love	7	52
1969	(Republic of Ireland) Alec Poole	7	76
1978	(England) Richard Longman	11	100
1979	(England) Richard Longman	10	97

=== European Touring Car Championship titles ===
Season	Driver	1	2	3	4	5	6	7	8	9	10	11	Points	Position
1964	(United Kingdom) Warwick Banks	7	7	-	7	3	7	7	7	7	7	7	66	1
1968	(United Kingdom) John Handley	6	(2)	6	6	(2)	6	-	9	9	(1.5)	6	48	1

=== Australian endurance racing class wins ===
Event	Driver	Class position	Overall position
1963 Armstrong 500	Doug Chivas Ken Wilkinson	1 (B)	6
1963 Six Hour Le Mans	David Thomas, Ian Durrant	1 (1000)	5
1964 Sandown 6 Hour International	Peter Manton, Brian Foley	1 (F)	2
1964 Armstrong 500	Bruce Maher, Charlie Smith	1 (B)	9
1964 Shell Le Mans 6 Hour Race	Ted Lisle	1 (Touring)	2
1965 International 6 Hour Touring Car Race	Bob Holden, Ron Haylen	1 (D)	3
1965 Armstrong 500	Brian Foley, Peter Manton	1 (C)	3
1965 Six Hour Le Mans	Ted Lisle, Mike Tighe	1 (1100)	5
1965 Lowood 4 Hour	John Harvey, Brian Foley	1 (D)	1
1966 Gallaher 500	Rauno Aaltonen, Bob Holden	1 (C)	1
1966 Le Mans 6 Hour Race	Ted Lisle	1 (Improved)	2
1967 Surfers Paradise Four Hour	Peter Cray, Don Holland	1 (B)	
1967 Gallaher 500	Tony Fall, Bob Holden	1 (C)	5
1967 Six Hour Le Mans	Jeff Dunkerton, Doug Mould	1	1
1968 Surfers Paradise 4-Hour	M McGregor, F Hunt	1 (C)	3
1968 Hardie-Ferodo 500	Don Holland, Charlie Smith	1 (C)	10
1968 Six Hour Le Mans	Rick Lisle, John Harris	1 (E)	2
1969 Rothmans 12 Hour Classic	Garry Hodge, John Leffler	1 (C)	2
1969 Hardie-Ferodo 500	Ron Gillard, Warren Gracie	1 (C)	14
1969 TVW Channel 7 Le Mans 6 Hour Race	Peter Briggs, Doug Mould	1 (1500)	2
1970 Rothmans 12 Hour	Don Holland, Bob Skelton	1 (C)	4
1970 TVW Channel 7 Six Hour Le Mans	Ray Thackwell, Jim Mullins	1	5
1971 Rothmans 3 Hour	Lakis Manticas	1 (B)	16
1971 Castrol Trophy	Lakis Manticas	1 (B)	7
1971 Sandown 250	Lakis Manticas	1 (B)	11
1971 Phillip Island 500K	Bill Stanley	1 (B)	10
1971 Rothmans 250	Lakis Manticas	1 (B)	
1972 Skipper Chrysler 6 Hour Le Mans	Jack Michael, David Jorritsma	1 (1300)	17
1974 Hardie-Ferodo 1000	Gary Leggatt, Peter Lander	1 (1300)	17
1975 Hardie-Ferodo 1000	Peter Lander, Bob Martin	1 (1300)	14

== Awards ==
BMC and Issigonis were awarded the Dewar Trophy by the Royal Automobile Club (RAC) for the innovative design and production of the Mini.

The Mini has won many other awards over the years, including second place in 1999's "Global" Car of the Century award, behind only the Model T Ford. In the same competition, run by the prestigious Global Automotive Elections Foundation, the Mini was selected "European Car of the Century". Grassroots Motorsports awarded Mini with the Editors' Choice award in 2002. The Mini also received awards for "Car of the Century" (Autocar magazine 1995) and "Number One Classic Car of All Time" (Classic & Sports Car magazine 1996).

In the end 5.3 million Minis were sold, making it the most popular British car ever made.

== Sales ==
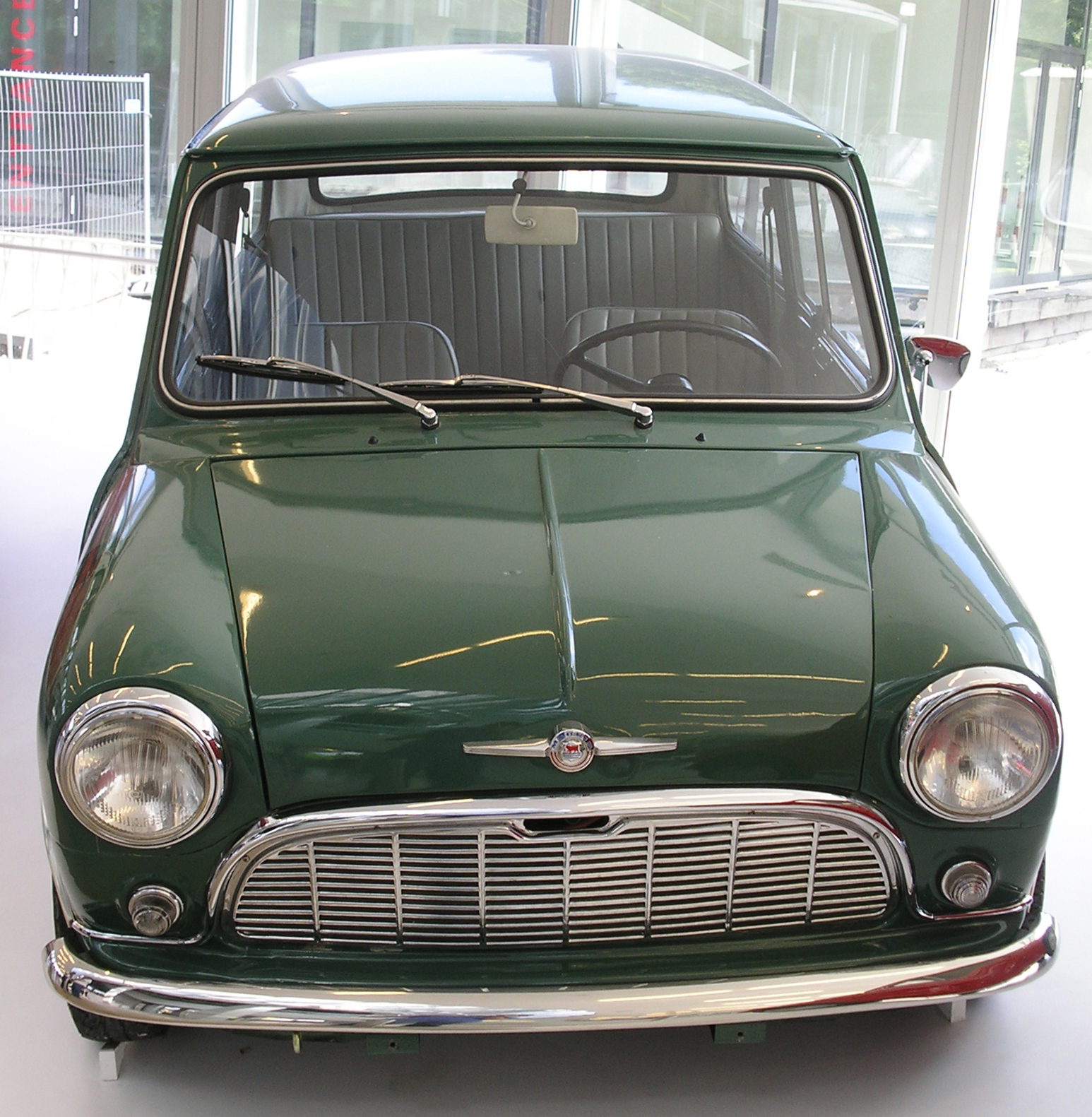
An almond green Mark I Morris Mini Minor

At its peak, the Mini was a strong seller in most of the countries where it was sold, with the United Kingdom inevitably receiving the highest volumes. The 1,000,000th Mini came off the production line in 1965, with the 2,000,000th in 1969. The 3,000,000th Mini came off the production line in 1972, with the 4,000,000th in 1976.

The Mini dominated the mini-car market until the arrival of the Hillman Imp in 1963. It outsold the Imp. Competition arrived with the more modern and practical Vauxhall Chevette of 1975, but the Mini continued to sell well until its "replacement"—the Metro—arrived in 1980. By this time, the Mini's design had been overtaken by numerous more modern and practical vehicles.

Although the Metro did not replace the Mini, production figures for the Mini dipped during the 1980s, and interest in the design was not revived until the reintroduction of the Mini Cooper in 1990. This helped sales of the Mini through the 1990s, to the end of production on 4 October 2000.

A total of 1,581,887 Minis were sold in the UK after its launch in 1959. The last new one to be registered was sold in 2004, some four years after the end of production.

Year	Cumulative sales
1962	500,000
1965	1 million
1969	2 million
1972	3 million
1976	4 million
1986	5 million
2000	5,387,862

The highest price ever paid for a Mini was at a Bonhams auction in 2007, when a works rally-prepared Mini (DJB 93B) sold for £100,500 ($196,980).

=== United States and Canada ===
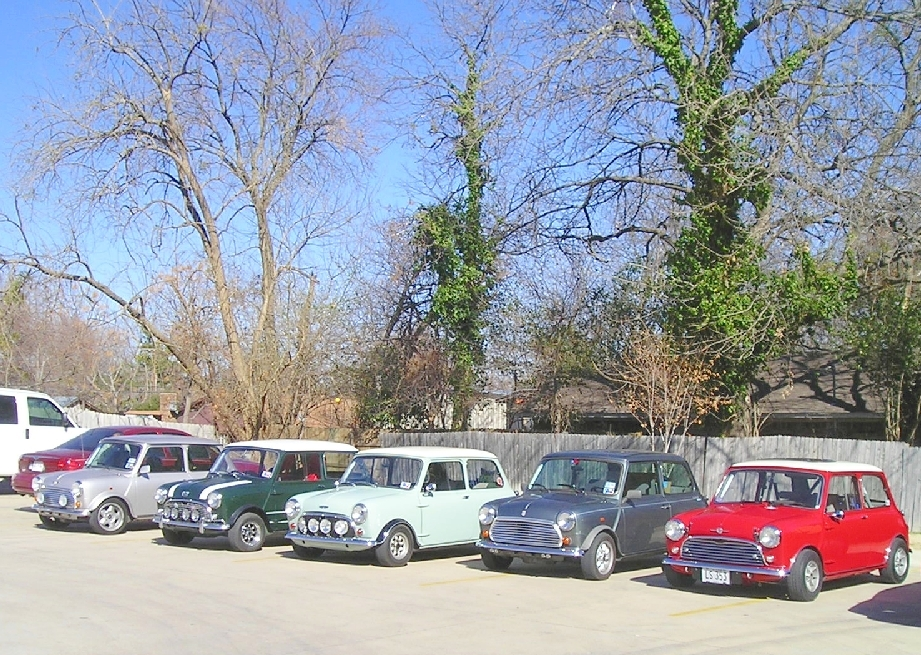
A meeting of the Mini Owners of Texas club in Grapevine, Texas

Between 1960 and 1967, BMC exported approximately 10,000 left-hand drive BMC Minis to the United States. Sales were discontinued when stricter federal safety standards were imposed in 1968 and the arrival of the larger and more profitable Austin America. Mini sales fell in the 1967 calendar year and the US importer was expecting the forthcoming Austin America to find a larger market. The America was also withdrawn in 1972 due to slow sales and the introduction of bumper-height standards. Mini sales continued in Canada until 1980. MkIII variants, as with their UK counterparts remained badged as a "Mini" (no distinction between Austin or Morris), and in 1976 with the takeover of British Leyland, became British Leyland Minis (MkIV). Leyland Minis also were subject to stricter government regulation with high bumpers, large turn indicators, warning buzzers and lights for seat belts and also a fitting of air pollution pumps which required a specially designed radiator.

Today the US government exempts cars older than 25 years from all import laws, so older Minis can be freely imported. The Canadian government applies a similar rule after 15 years. In the state of California, the California Smog Check is mandated for automobiles 1976 and newer.

== Safety record ==
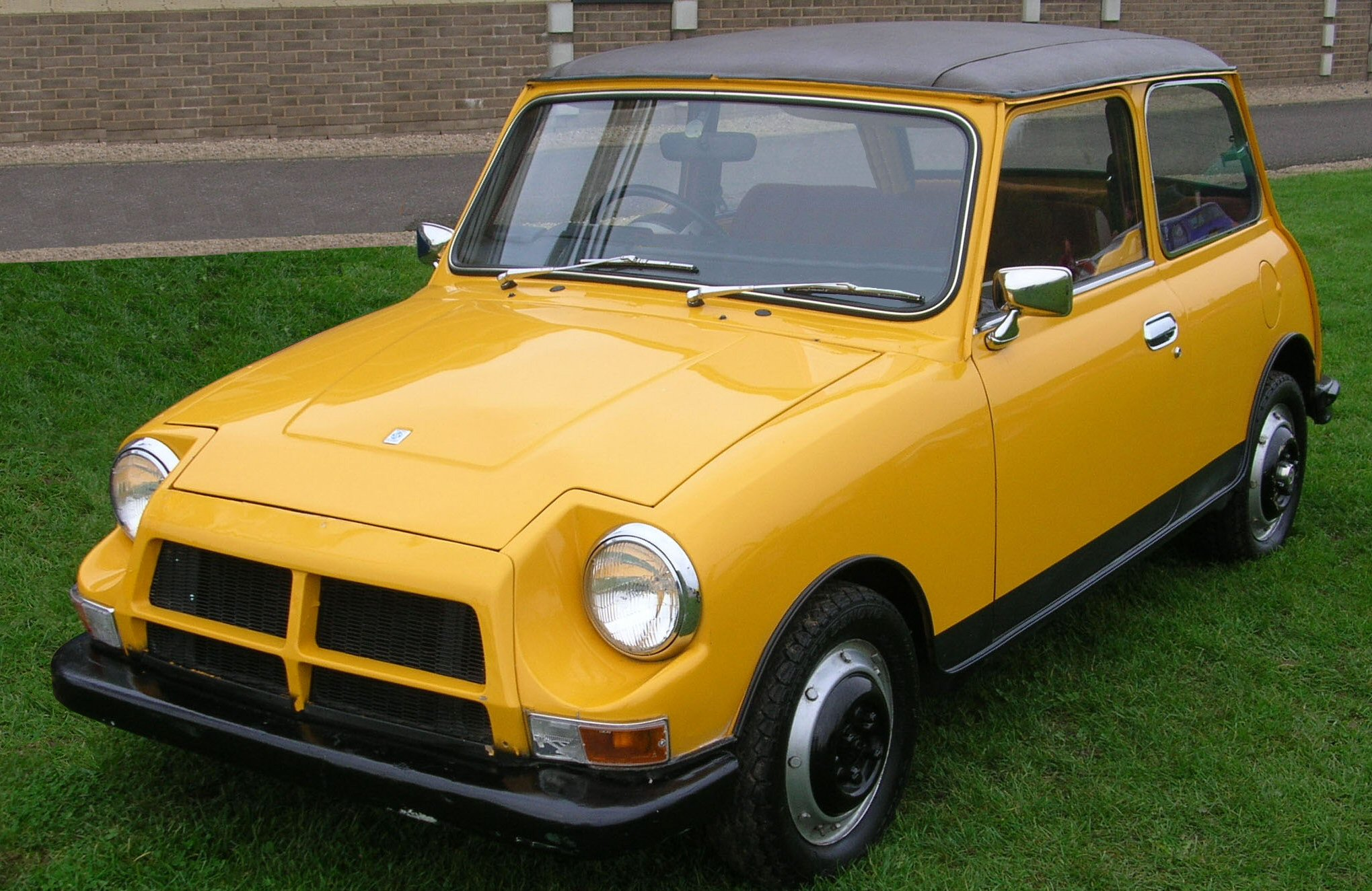
1974 Mini Clubman Safety Research Vehicle—SRV4

Issigonis designed the Mini with an emphasis on active safety. Asked about the crashworthiness of the Mini, he said: "I make my cars with such good brakes, such good steering, that if people get into a crash it's their own fault" and "I don't design my cars to have accidents".

In July 1965 BMC announced that following "comments by safety experts" about the Mini's external door handles, these would be modified on new cars so that the gap between the handle and the door panel would be effectively closed.

Nicholas Faith states in his book that Murray Mackay, one of the UK's leading motor vehicle crash and safety researchers, was critical of the pre-1967 Mini's passive safety features, including the protruding filler cap, the door latch, and the vulnerability of the passenger space to engine intrusion.

The Mini was withdrawn from the American market because it could not meet the 1968 US safety regulations and emission standards, and although often updated, not sufficiently to comply with US regulations. It continued to be sold in Canada until 1980.

The Mini was modified during its production to improve its safety. In 1974 a prototype Mini experimental safety vehicle was built, the Mini Clubman SRV4. It featured a longer crumple zone, a "pedestrian friendly" front-end, run-flat tyres, strengthened door sills, extra internal padding and recessed door handles, the latter having been used earlier on Australian-built Minis owing to local laws. Jack Daniels, one of the original Issigonis team, is stated to have been working on further safety improvements for the Mini when he retired in 1977. Several times it was thought that safety regulations would stop Mini production. Safety improved in 1996, with the introduction of airbags and side-impact bars. The Mini, challenged by increasingly demanding European safety and pollution standards, was planned by British Aerospace to be taken out of production in 1996, but BMW chose to invest to keep the Mini legal until the launch of a new model.

In January 2007 Which? magazine listed the Mini City in its "Ten worst cars for safety (since 1983)" list, alongside other economical, lightweight, fuel-efficient cars like the Hyundai Pony 1.2L, Fiat Panda 900 Super, Suzuki Alto GL, Daihatsu Domino, Citroën AX 11 RE, Yugo 45 and 55, Peugeot 205 GL, and the Citroën 2CV6.

A UK Department for Transport statistics publication, presenting estimates of the risk of driver injury in two-car injury collisions, based on reported road accident data, estimated that the 1990–2000 Mini was one of two small cars (the other being the Hyundai Atoz), which, with an estimated 84% of drivers likely to be injured, presented the greatest risk of driver injury; the average risk for the small car category was 76%.

== 50th anniversary ==
Several key events marked the 50th anniversary of the Mini in 2009. On 13 January 2009, the Royal Mail released a limited edition of stamps entitled "British Design Classics", featuring an original, egg-shell blue, MK1 Mini, registration XAA 274. On 17 May, a world record parade of 1,450 Minis congregated at Crystal Palace as part of a London to Brighton run. The following week, 10,000 Minis and 25,000 people attended an anniversary party at Silverstone Circuit on the border of Buckinghamshire and Northamptonshire.

Between 7 and 10 August 2009 approximately 4000 minis from around the world congregated at Longbridge Birmingham to celebrate the 50th anniversary. On 26 August 2009, smallcarBIGCITY launched in London to provide sightseeing tours of the capital in a fleet of restored Mini Coopers.

== See also ==
- Mini (Mark I)
- List of Mini-based cars
- List of best-selling vehicle nameplates
- London to Brighton events
- List of Mini limited editions
- Mini Hatch
- International Mini Meet
