= 1961 Six Hour Le Mans =

The 1961 Six Hour Le Mans was an endurance motor race for sports cars and sedans. The race was staged at the Caversham circuit in Western Australia on Monday, 5 June 1961. It was the seventh annual Six Hour Le Mans.

The race was won by Ray Barfield driving an Aston Martin DB3S.

== Results ==
Position	Drivers	No.	Car	Entrant	Category	Cat. Pos.	Class	Class Pos.	Laps
1	Ray Barfield	1	Aston Martin DB3S		Sport Cars	1st	Sport Cars Over 2601 cc	1st	187
2	Bob McDowall	3	Triumph TR3A		Sport Cars	2nd	Sport Cars 1601-2000 cc	1st	183
3	Vic Johnson	8	Austin-Healey 100-4		Sport Cars	3rd			173
4	Wally Knox, B. McKay	7	Holden FX		Sedans	1st	Sedans 2001-2600 cc	1st	171
5	Dave Sadique, Ted Hanke	17	Simca Montlhéry		Sedans	2nd	Sedans 1001-1300 cc	1st	169
6	Nev McBeth, Gordon Bell	27	Austin-Healey Sprite		Sport Cars		Sport Cars 0 to 1,000 cc	1st	167
7	John Glasson	16	Austin Lancer		Sedans	3rd	Sedans 1301-1600 cc	1st	161
8	Vin Smith, Peter Bond	25	Ford Anglia		Sedans		Sedans 851-1000 cc	1st	161
9	Lloyd Trezise	28	Ford V8		Sedans		Sedans Over 2601 cc	1st	158
10	David McKay, Jack Wynhoff	23	Renault Gordini	Diesel Motors	Sedans		Sedans 0-850 cc	1st	158
11	Roy Bolton	12	Standard Vanguard						155
12	L. Stevens, J. Ward	26	Ford Anglia						153
13	R. Swindells, R Flugge	9	Austin-Healey						151
14	Don Reimann, R. Bettridge	24	Ford Anglia						139
15	John Covich, A. M. Bone	21	Renault Dauphine						117
16	Max McCrackan, A. Keightley	20	Elfin Simca		Sport Cars		Sport Cars 1001-1600 cc	1st	93
17	Lionel Beattie	2	Repco Holden Sports		Sport Cars		Sport Cars 2001-2600 cc	1st	50
18	Bob Annear	14	Pegasis						47
DNF	K. Lang, R. E. Saunders	15	HRG						
DNF	Bill Inwood, G. H. Shilkin	19	Simca						
DNF	Stan Starcevich	33	Holden Sports						153
DNF	Wally Higgs, Noel Potts	30	NSU Prinz						137
DNF	Dave Sullivan	4	Holden						64
DNF	George Wakelin	5	Holden						42
DNF	Mike Tighe	18	Simca						40
DNF	H. Van Laanen	10	Austin-Healey						3
DNS	C. Reardon, Jack Ayers	6	Holden						-
DNS	Colin Metcher	29	Monza Healey						-
DNS	Jack Ayers, Mal Chapman	31	Austin-Healey 100-6						-
DNS	Noel Aldous	32	Monza Healey						-

The winning car covered a record 187 laps (385 miles / 620 km) despite the fact that it rained throughout the race.
