= 1959 6-Hour Le Mans Production Car Race =

The 1959 6-Hour Le Mans Production Car Race was a motor race staged on 1 June 1959 at the Caversham Race Circuit in Western Australia, Australia. It was organised by the WA Sporting Car Club, and was the fifth annual Six Hour Le Mans.

The race was won by Clem Dwyer and Vin Smith, driving a Triumph TR3A.

== Results ==
Position	Drivers	No.	Car	Entrant	Cat. pos.	Category	Class pos.	Class	Laps
1	Clem Dywer, Vin Smith	1	Triumph TR3A	Diesel Motors	1	Sports Cars			176
2	Lionel Beattie	10	MGA		2	Sports Cars			174
3	Merv Dudley, Doug Green		MGA	Mercury Motors	3	Sports Cars			174
4	Jack Ayers		Holden 48-215	Superior Cars	1	Sedan Cars	1	1601-2500cc	172
5	Jim Harwood, Bill Downey	2	Triumph TR3A	Performance Cars					171
6	Darryl McGuinness		Austin-Healey	Reimann Motors					171
7	Dave Sullivan		Holden 48-215		2	Sedan Cars			171
8	Ray Barfield		Triumph TR3						164
9	David Sadique		Simca Aronde		3	Sedan Cars	1	1101-1300cc	163
10	Ron Heath		Jaguar XK120						159
11	Don Reimann, John Glasson		Standard Ten Cadet	Diesel Motors			1	851-1100cc	155
12	Syd Negus		Plymouth Sports						152
13	R. Betteridge		Morris Minor						150
14	Bob Annear, D. Reiman		Standard Ten Cadet	Diesel Motors					148
15	Brian Lemon		Volkswagen						147
16	Lloyd Trezise		Ford V8 (1938)				1	Over 2500cc	146
17	Mike Geneve, R. Pelusey		Skoda						143
18	L. Johnson, J. Wynhoff		Renault Dauphine				1	Up to 850cc	138
19	Aub Melrose		Austin-Healey						116
DNF	Harry van Lannen		Austin-Healey						131
DNF	Stan Starcevich		Holden						122
DNF	Tony Carboni		Austin-Healey						96
DNF	Jim Ward		Ford Zephyr						69
DNF	Mal Chapman		MGTF						15

=== Teams Award ===
Diesel Motors - Clem Dywer & Vin Smith (Triumph TR3A), Don Reimann & John Glasson (Standard Ten Cadet), Bob Annear & D Reiman (Standard Ten Cadet)

=== Lambretta Trophy ===
David Sadique (Simca Aronde)

=== Notes ===
- Start: Le Mans type
- Entries: 27
- Starters: 24
- Finishers: 19
- Distance covered by winning car: 387 miles
- Average speed of winning car: 64.9 mph
