= 1960 Six Hour Le Mans =

The 1960 Six Hour Le Mans was a motor race for sports cars and sedans. The event was held at the Caversham Airfield circuit in Western Australia on 6 June 1960. It was the sixth annual Six Hour Le Mans race.

The race was won by Jack Ayers and Lionel Beattie driving a Holden Sports.

== Results ==
Position	Drivers	No.	Car	Entrant	Class pos.	Class	Laps
1	Jack Ayers, Lionel Beattie	9	Holden Sports	Superior Cars	1	Sports 2001–3000cc	178
2	Jeff Dunkerton		MGA 1500	Winterbottoms	1	Sports 1301–1600cc	177
3	Dave Sullivan, A Dodd		Holden	Northside Service Station	1	Sedan 2001–3000cc	176
4	Doug Green, Colin Weir		Triumph TR3A	Reimann Motors	1	Sports 1601–2000cc	173
5	Gavin Sandford-Morgan, Henry Short		Lotus Elite	DE Jolly Ltd	1	Sedan 1000–1300cc	172
6	Aubrey Melrose, Vin Smith		Porsche 1600	AG Melrose	1	Sedan 1301–1600cc	172
7	Syd Negus, K Wilkinson		Plymouth Sports	SA Negus	1	Sports Over 3000cc	172
8	Bob Avery		Simca	Wentworth Motors		Sedan – unknown	170
9	Mal Chapman		Austin-Healey 100/6	Superior Cars		Sports – unknown	167
10	George Wakelin, D Edwards		Holden	G Wakelin		Sedan – unknown	161
11	David Sadique, S Templar		Simca	Ecurie Sainte		Sedan – unknown	160
12	Don Reimann, Peter Bond		Ford Anglia	Duncan Motor Co Pty Ltd	1	Sedan 851–1000cc	160
13	Bob McDowall		Volkswagen	RS McDowall		Sedan – unknown	158
14	T Rice, D McGuiness		Austin-Healey Sprite	T Rice	1	Sports 851–1000cc	157
15	TW Sands		Volkswagen	Webster Motors		Sedan – unknown	155
16	L Allwood		Ford Thames	L Allwood		Sedan – unknown	153
17	W Kruyssen, B Lemon		Volkswagen	W Kruyssen		Sedan – unknown	152
18	R Betteridge, J Glasson		Morris Minor 1000	Modern Motor Sales		Sedan – unknown	151
19	Lloyd Trezise		Ford V8 (1938)	L Trezise	1	Sedan Over 3000cc	150
20	Jack Wynhoff		Renault Dauphine	Maison Motors	1	Sedan Up to 850cc	143
21	Frank Baden-Powell, S Campbell	32	Goggomobil Dart	WJ Lucas Ltd	1	Sports Up to 850cc	134
DNF	Wally Knox		Holden				
DNF	Ray Barfield		Aston Martin DB3S				60

=== Notes ===
- Attendance: 6,000
- Start: Le Mans-style
