= 1958 6 Hour Production Car Race (Caversham) =

1958 Australian endurance motor race

The 1958 6 Hour Production Car Race was an endurance motor race staged on 2 June 1958 at the Caversham Circuit, in Western Australia. It was open to production cars competing in "Sports Car" and "Sedan Car" classes. The race, which was the fourth in a sequence of annual "Six Hour Le Mans" races to be held in Western Australia between 1955 and 1972 was won by Jim Harwood and Bill Downey driving a Triumph TR2.

== Results ==
| Position | Drivers | No. | Car | Entrant | Class | Class pos. | Laps |
| 1 | Jim Harwood, Bill Downey | 21 | Triumph TR2 | Performance Cars | Sports Cars Over 1500cc | 1 | 181 |
| 2 | Barry Ranford Sr, Barry Ranford Jr | 8 | Morgan | Loftus Service Station | Sports Cars Over 1500cc | 2 | 181 |
| 3 | Aub Melrose, (Dick Blythe) | 17 | Austin-Healey 100-4 | A Melrose Motors | Sports Cars Over 1500cc | 3 | 175 |
| 4 | Peter Morgan, Merv Dudley | 41 | MGA | Mercury Motors | Sports Cars Under 1500cc | 1 | 174 |
| 5 | Dick Blythe, Sid Taylor | 29 | Austin Lancer | Winterbottom Motors | Sedan Cars 1101 - 1500cc | 1 | 171 |
| 6 | David Sadique, Bob Avery | 26 | Simca Elysee | DH Sedique | Sedan Cars 1101 - 1500cc | 2 | 167 |
| 7 | Vin Smith | 9 | Austin-Healey | V Smith | Sports Cars Over 1500cc | 4 | 165 |
| 8 | Jim Ward, Peter Nicol | 35 | Ford Zephyr Mark II | J Ward | Sedan Cars Over 2500cc | 1 | 164 |
| 9 | E Allwood, H Magill | 24 | Thames | EL Attwood | Sedan Cars 1101 - 1500cc | 3 | 163 |
| 10 | Clem Dwyer, Hugh McKinlay | 38 | Renault Dauphine | Diesel Motors | Sedan Cars 500 - 850cc | 1 | 159 |
| 11 | John Glasson, John Hayes | 25 | Standard Vanguard | JG Glasson | Sedan Cars 1600 - 2500cc | 1 | 158 |
| 12 | Ray Bettridge, Bill Downey | 33 | Morris Minor 1000 | Modern Motors | Sedan Cars 850 - 1100cc | 1 | 157 |
| 13 | Syd Negus, Sid Taylor | 27 | Austin A95 | Winterbottom Motors | Sedan Cars Over 2500cc | 2 | 155 |
| 14 | Mal Chapman | 43 | MGTC | M Chapman | Sports Cars Under 1500cc | 2 | 153 |
| 15 | Brian Lemon, B Herman | 30 | Volkswagen | BJ Lemon | Sedan Cars 1101 - 1500cc | 4 | 149 |
| 16 | Bob Annear, Sid Taylor | 28 | Austin A55 | Winterbottom Motors | Sedan Cars 1101 - 1500cc | 5 | 147 |
| 17 | N Joddrell, H Joddrell | 37 | Vauxhall Victor | Allwood Motors | Sedan Cars 1101 - 1500cc | 6 | 145 |
| 18 | J Lenton, R Bettridge | 32 | Wolseley 1500 | JM Lenton | Sedan Cars 1101 - 1500cc | 7 | 136 |
| 19 | Dave Sullivan, Bob Biltoff | 36 | Holden | Northside Service Station | Sedan Cars 1600 - 2500cc | 2 | 48 |
| DNF | G Haynes, Graham Bowra | 23 | Morgan | G Hayes | Sports Cars Over 1500cc | - | ? |
| DNF | Colin Metcher, W Green | 40 | MGTC | C Metcher | Sports Cars Under 1500cc | - | ? |
| DNF | Jack Ayres, D Reimes | 31 | Holden | Superior Cars | Sedan Cars 1600 - 2500cc | - | ? |

=== Notes ===
- Attendance: 10,000
