= 1957 Le Mans Six Hour Production Car Race (Caversham) =

The 1957 Le Mans Six Hour Production Car Race was an endurance motor race staged at the Caversham Circuit in Western Australia on 3 June 1957. The event, which included classes for "Sports cars" and "Closed cars", was the third annual "Six Hour Le Mans" race to be staged at Caversham. The race was won by Sydney Anderson and Sid Taylor driving an Austin-Healey 100-4, the win being the third consecutive "Six Hour Le Mans" victory by the pair.

== Results ==
Position	Drivers	No.	Car	Entrant	Class pos.	Class	Laps
1	Sydney Anderson, Sid Taylor	1	Austin-Healey 100-4	We Never Sleep Pty Ltd	1	Sports cars Over 1500cc	147
2	Alan Mackintosh, John Trowell		Triumph TR2	Sydney Anderson Autos			143
3	R Heath, M Williams		Jaguar XK120	RE Heath			142
4	H Mackinlay		Simca Elysee		1	Closed cars 1100cc - 1500cc	137
5	D Blythe		Austin A55				136
6	J Gibbons		MG TF		1	Sports cars Under 1500cc	130
7	W Allwood		Ford Anglia				128
8	C Dwyer, V Smith		Renault Dauphine		1	Closed cars Under 850cc	123
9	R Downey, R Annear		Austin A30				122
10	C van Buren, M van Buren		Volkswagen				122
11	B Martin, D Hendrix		Volkswagen				121
12	N Aldous, A Melrose		Renault 750				118
13	J Harwood, B Ranford Jr						111
14	P Hahn, E Hahn		Volkswagen				95

The total number of starters in the race is unknown.

The winning car covered 350 miles (564 km) at an average speed of 64 mph (103 km/h).
