= 1955 Six Hour Le Mans =

The 1955 Six Hour Le Mans was an endurance motor race, staged at the Caversham Airfield circuit near Perth in Western Australia on 11 April 1955. The event was the first of a sequence of eighteen Six Hour Le Mans races to be held in Western Australia between 1955 and 1972.

The race, which attracted eleven starters, was staged on the "Triangle" layout of the Caversham circuit as the more commonly used "D" layout was considered to be too demanding for an event of this duration. The event was dominated by the Austin-Healey 100 driven by Sydney Anderson & Sid Taylor, with its only serious opposition, a Jaguar XK120, retiring near the halfway mark. Much of the race was held in wet conditions, a situation which would occur frequently during the history of the Six Hour.

== Results ==
Position	Drivers	No.	Car	Class	Class pos.	Laps
1	Sydney Anderson, Sid Taylor		Austin-Healey 100	Over 1500cc Sports	1	127
2	Aub Badger		Holden FJ	Class D (2000 - 3000cc)	1	119
3	Ray Bailey, Geoff Way		MGTF	Under 1500cc Sports	1	115
4	Tony Frederico		Fiat 1100	Class G (750 - 1100cc)	1	114
5	Hugh McKinlay		Ford Anglia	Class F (1100 - 1500cc)	1	112
6	Ray Davies		MGTF			108
7	Barry Ranford Sr		Volkswagen			102
8	Syd Negus		Austin A30			99
?	F de Bonde	56	Austin-Healey 100			?
DNF	?		Simca			?
DNF	?		Jaguar XK120			?
