= 1964 Shell Le Mans 6 Hour Race =

The 1964 Shell Le Mans 6 Hour Race was an endurance motor race open to Sports Cars and Touring Cars. The event was held at the Caversham circuit in Western Australia on the Foundation Day Holiday Monday, 1 June 1964.

== Results ==
Position	Drivers	No.	Car	Entrant	Category	Class Placing	Laps
1	Harley Pederick; Stan Starcevich	11	Jaguar E-type	H Pederick	Sports	1st Sports	199
2	Ted Lisle	9	Morris Cooper S	Winterbottom Motors	Touring	1st Modified Sedan	188
3	Rod Donovan; Jamie Gard	24	Holden 48-215	Kaves Engineering	Touring	1st Modified Sedan 2001-2600cc	181
4	Dick Roberts; Bob Avery	4	Chrysler Valiant	Mrs J Roberts	Touring	1st Modified Sedan Over 2600cc	180
5	Bob Avery; Dick Roberts	2	Chrysler Valiant	Mrs J Roberts	Touring	1st Unmodified Sedan	179
6	Jack Wynoff; Dave Sullivan Snr	7	Renault R8	Maison Motors	Touring		177
7	Alois Visich; Don Milne	32	Morris Cooper	A Visich	Touring	1st Unmodified Sedan 751-1000cc	173
8	John Fenton; John Bertina	46	Holden	J Fenton	Touring		172
9	John Hughes; Jim Brewer	12	Vauxhall Viva	Attwood's Motorama	Touring	1st Unmodified Sedan 1001-1300cc	171
10	Graham Purchas; Brian Muhling	30	Morris Cooper	G Purchas	Touring		169
11	John Maloney; Jo Weir	42	Triumph Spitfire	J Maloney	Sports	1st Sports 1101-1600cc	169
12	Lindsay Ashworth; Bruce Harding	6	Holden	Harding Ampol Service Station	Sports	1st Sports 2001-3000cc	163
13	Terry Cuncliffe; Warren Matthews	3	Simca	WJ McPherson	Touring		163
14	Vaughan Wilde; Jim Maslin	28	Austin Lancer	V Wilde	Touring	1st Modified Sedan 1301-1600cc	161
15	Keith Hope; Lloyd Tresize	43	Morris 850	Tresize's Garage	Touring		155
16	Mike Cuss; Barry Heatley	19	Renault 750	CBC Developments	Sports	1st Sports Under 750cc	153
17	Derek Fletcher; Vic Watson	38	Ford Anglia	Crystal Brook Service Station	Touring	1st Modified Sedan 751-1000cc	152
18	Jamie Gard; Rod Donovan	23	Holden	Ray Clarke Cars	Touring		151
19	Judith Baker; Margaret Mathews	17	Volkswagen	Abergonny Motors	Sports		147
20	Bill Inwood; John Lewis	25	Holden	Theatre Service Station	Sports		147
21	Darryl Manning; Ian Durrant	45	Simca	BP Loton Park Service Station	Touring		141
22	Ted Richards; Joe Silla	35	Holden	T Richards	Touring		139
23	Don Noack; Rod Slater	18	Renault 750	D Baker	Sports	1st sports 751-1100cc	124
24	Jeff Dunkerton	21	Lotus Super 7	G Dunkerton	Sports		121
25	Derek Vince; Murray Charnley	37	Elfin	Crystal Brook Service Station	Sports		80
DNF	Wally Higgs	14	Peugeot Sports		Sports		163
DNF	Graham Armitage; Max Clarke	26	Holden		Touring		113
DNF	Rod Waller; David Rockford	15	Repco Holden Sports		Sports		99
DNF	John Lewis	39	Holden		Touring		82
DNF	George Wakelin; Dave Edwards	29	Holden 48-215		Sports		76
DNF	Owen Stringer; Mike Tighe	22	Ford Cortina GT Mk 1		Touring		71
DNF	Fred Coxon; Peter Bond	44	Holden Sports		Sports		63
DNF	Geoff Stanton; Dick Ward	27	Holden		Touring		60
DNF	John Bavera; Dave Sullivan Snr	34	Austin-Healey 100		Sports		53
DNF	Graham Colledge; Jim Lydeker	31	Holden		Touring		42
DNF	Bob Biltoft; Rod Mitchell	4	Peugeot Special		Sports		33
DNF	Bruce Harding; Lindsay Ashworth	5	Holden		Touring		31
DNF	Brian McKay	10	Peugeot		Touring		13
DNF	John Glasson	16	Atlantis		Sports		12
DNF	Tony McAlinden	36	Peugeot Sports		Sports		5
