= 1956 Six Hour Le Mans =

Motor racing meeting

The 1956 Six Hour Le Mans was an endurance motor race for Closed Production Cars and Sports Cars. The event was held at the Caversham Airfield in Western Australia on 20 May 1956, utilizing the "Triangle" circuit. It was the second Six Hour Le Mans race to be held in Western Australia. The race was scheduled to be run on 13 May but was postponed until 20 May.

The race was won by Sydney Anderson and Sid Taylor driving an Austin-Healey 100.

== Results ==
| Position | Drivers | No. | Car | Entrant | Category | Class | Class pos. | Laps |
| 1 | Sydney Anderson, Sid Taylor | 15 | Austin-Healey 100 | Sydney Anderson Automotoves Pty. Ltd. | Sports Cars | Over 1500cc | 1 | 166 |
| 2 | Aubrey Melrose | | Austin-Healey 100 | Aubrey Melrose | | | | 164 |
| 3 | Shirley Deane, G. Bridges | | Austin-Healey 100 | Miss S. Deane | | | | 152 |
| 4 | T. Carboni, V. Carboni | 21 | Holden | Sydney Anderson Automotoves Pty. Ltd. | Closed Production Cars | 1501 to 2500cc | 1 | 147 |
| =5 | Aub Badger | 35 | Holden | | | | | 145 |
| =5 | D. Alexander, B. Wray | 24 | | | | | | 145 |
| 7 | Noel Aldous, F. Coxon | 38 | MG TC Midget | | Sports Cars | Up to 1500cc | 1 | 139 |
| =10 | Clem Dwyer, Johnny Walker | 4 | Renault 750 | Diesel Motors Pty. Ltd. | Closed Production Cars | 751 to 1100cc | 1 | 136 |
| ? | A. Mackintosh, W. Solloway | 19 | Chevrolet | Sydney Anderson Automotoves Pty. Ltd. | Closed Production Cars | Over 2500cc | 1 | 136 |
| ? | E. Allwood, G. Magill | 33 | Ford Anglia | E. Allwood | Closed Production Cars | 1101 to 1500cc | | 134 |
| ? | J. Nelson, J. Harwood | 2 | Renault 750 | Diesel Motors Pty. Ltd. | Closed Production Cars | Up to 750cc | 1 | 126 |
| ? | P. Morgan, V. Smith | 3 | Renault 750 | Diesel Motors Pty. Ltd. | Closed Production Cars | Up to 750cc | | |
| ? | Murray Williamson, Raymond Clarke | | Ford V8 | | | | | ? |
| ? | | | Standard Vanguard | | | | | ? |
| ? | | | Fiat | | | | | ? |
| ? | | | Volkswagen | | | | | ? |
| ? | | | Triumph TR2 | | | | | ? |

The above results are incomplete.

The Teams Prize was awarded to the Diesel Motors Renault Team which comprised cars No 2 and the No 3 competing in the under 750cc class.
