= 1972 Skipper Chrysler 6 Hour Le Mans =

Layout of the Wanneroo Park

The 1972 Skipper Chrysler 6 Hour Le Mans was an endurance motor race for Sports Open, Sports Closed, Improved Production Touring Cars & Series Production Touring Cars. The event was staged by the W.A. Sporting Car Club at the Wanneroo Park Circuit in Western Australia on Sunday 4 June 1972. It was the 18th and final 6 Hour Le Mans race to be held.

== Results ==
Position	Drivers	No.	Car	Entrant	Class	Class pos.	Laps
1	Ray Thackwell, Jim Mullins	4	Porsche 911S	Ray Thackwell Racing	Sports Closed 1601-2500cc	1	295
2	Wayne Negus, Neville Grigsby		Holden Torana GTR-XU1		Series Production 3001-6000cc	1	279
3	Chris Royston, Colin Hall		Lotus 47	Shell Racing	Sports Closed 1601-2500cc	2	270
4	Basil Ricciardello, Neville Cooper		Alfa Romeo GTA	B Ricciardello	Sports Closed 1301-1600cc	1	262
5	Felix Smetana, Tony McAlinden		Lotus Super 7		Sports Open 1301-1600cc	1	256
6	Barry Coleman, Lance Barrett		Bolwell Mk. 7		Sports Closed 2501-5000cc	1	254
7	Stuart Kostera, George Cole		Matich SR3		Sports Open 2501-3000cc	1	254
8	Bill Russell, John Hagarty		Datsun SR311		Sports Open 1601-2500cc	1	254
9	Gordon Leney, Dave Sullivan Jr.		Holden Torana GTR-XU1		Series Production 3001-6000cc	2	251
10	Graeme Ibbotson, Bob Creasy		Jomax Ford		Sports Open 1601-2500cc	2	250
11	Patrick Reed, Trevor Dunning		MGB		Sports Closed 1601-2500cc	3	237
12	C Garrett, Phil Davenport		MGB		Sports Open 1601-2500cc	3	234
13	G Moffat, G Appleby		MGB				234
14	Howie Sangster, Rick Lisle, Craig McAllister		Chrysler VH Valiant Charger		Series Production 3001-6000cc	3	233
15	Bill Downey, Noel Mitchell		Lotus Elan		Sports Open 1301-1600cc	2	229
16	Dave Cliffe, R Mouncey		Lotus Cortina		Improved Production 1301-1600cc	1	226
17	Jack Michael, David Jorritsma		Morris Cooper S		Series Production Up to 1300cc	1	224
18	Adrian Lewis, Elemer Vajda		Morris Cooper S		Series Production Up to 1300cc	2	224
19	Stratton Joel, John Farrell		Holden Torana GTR-XU1				220
20	Murray Thomas, Tim Garratt		Datsun - Healey		Sports Open 1301-1600cc	3	197
21	Alby Valikov, Doug Tyler		Honda S800		Sports Open Up to 1300cc	2	187
22	Ross Crump, L Derriman		Fiat		Sports Closed 1301-1600cc	2	?
?	Jack Kennedy, Terry Lyons		Morris Mini		Sports Open Up to 1300cc	1	?
DNF	Howie Sangster, Craig McAllister	1	McLaren LT170				194
DNF	Ian Diffen, Ron Bairstow		Chrysler VH Valiant Charger				128
DNF	Gordon Mitchell, Brian Cole		Austin-Healey Sprite				100
DNF	John Haynes, Ray Tyler		Morgan V8 4.7				1
DNF	Peter Doney, Paul Wilkins		Morris Cooper S				?
DNF	Brian Rhodes, Rod Collins		Chrysler VH Valiant Charger				?
DNF	Murray Charnley, Davis Hipperson		Lotus 23B				?
DNF	Leo Stubber, Bob Kingsbury		Porsche 911S				?
DNF	Bill Maddocks, Peter Green		Monaco GT Clubman				?
DNF	Bill Nitschke, Bill Lee		Holden LC Torana GTR-XU1				?
DNF	Neville Cooper, Ray Johnson		Triumph Spitfire				?
DNF	Michael Hector, John Farrell		Holden HQ Monaro				?

=== Race statistics ===
- Start: Le Mans-style
- Starters: 37
- Average speed of winning car: 73.79 mph
- Race record: Thackwell & Mullins set a new race record of 295 laps, breaking that set by Howie Sangster & Don O'Sullivan in the 1970 race by eight laps.

== References & notes ==
- The Racing Car News race report states that there were 37 starters in the event with 21 finishers and 16 DNFs. The race results published at www.terrywalkersplace.com list 35 starters, 23 finishers and 12 DNFs.
- The results at www.terrywalkersplace.com show the Kennedy / Lyons Mini as winning its class although its outright position is lower than that of the Valikov / Tyler Honda which is shown as 2nd in that class. The above results table reflects those published at www.terrywalkersplace.com.
- Racing Car News lists Kostera / Cole, Russell / Hagarty and Coleman / Barrett as 6th, 7th and 8th respectively which differs from the results at www.terrywalkersplace.com
