= 1967 Six Hour Le Mans =

The 1967 Six Hour Le Mans was an endurance motor race for Sports Cars and Touring Cars. The event, which attracted 38 starters, was staged at the Caversham Airfield circuit in Western Australia on 5 June 1967. It was the thirteenth Six Hour Le Mans race.

The race was won by Jeff Dunkerton and Doug Mould driving a Morris Cooper S.

== Results ==
Position	Drivers	No.	Car	Entrant	Laps
1	Jeff Dunkerton, Doug Mould	6	Morris Cooper S	Le May Racing Team	203
2	Ron Thorp	1	AC Cobra 289		202
3	Paul Casellas, Bob Kingsbury		Hurricane V8		190
4	John Trowell, Mike Tighe		Alfa Romeo GTV	Team Reimann	187
5	Howie Sangster, J Percival		Ford Cortina GT		184
6	H Scott, N Scott		Holden HD Station Sedan		182
7	Dick Roberts		Holden HR Premier X2		181
8	A McCarthy, M Johnson		Holden FJ		180
9	Stuart Kostera		Ford Anglia		180
10	John Alford, P Robertson		Morris 850	Le May Racing Team	178
?	Cavanough, Knox		Holden		46
?	John Bertina		Holden FJ 179		
?	Maslin		Renault		
?	Bartlett		Holden Sports		
?	Bob Biltoft		Ford Sports		
?	Len Brockwell		Ford Anglia		
?	Hall, Davies		Holden		
?	O'Sullivan, Jamie Gard, Downey	3	Cooper Ford		
DNF	Ted Lisle	5	Morris Cooper S	Team Reimann	144
DNF	Mitchell		Peugeot Holden		
DNF	Vince		Elfin Streamliner		
DNF	Briggs		MGB		
DNF	Goddard, Matthews		Holden		
DNF	Owen Stringer		Ford Cortina 220		
DNF	Ross Urquhart		Lotus Super Seven		
DNF	Gordon Stephenson		Alfa Romeo GTA		
DNF	Stan Starcevich		Ford Cortina Lotus		56
DNF	Ken Glasgow		Morris Minor 1000		
DNF	John Glassen		Rambler Sports		

Note : The above listing is incomplete.
