= 1963 Six Hour Le Mans =

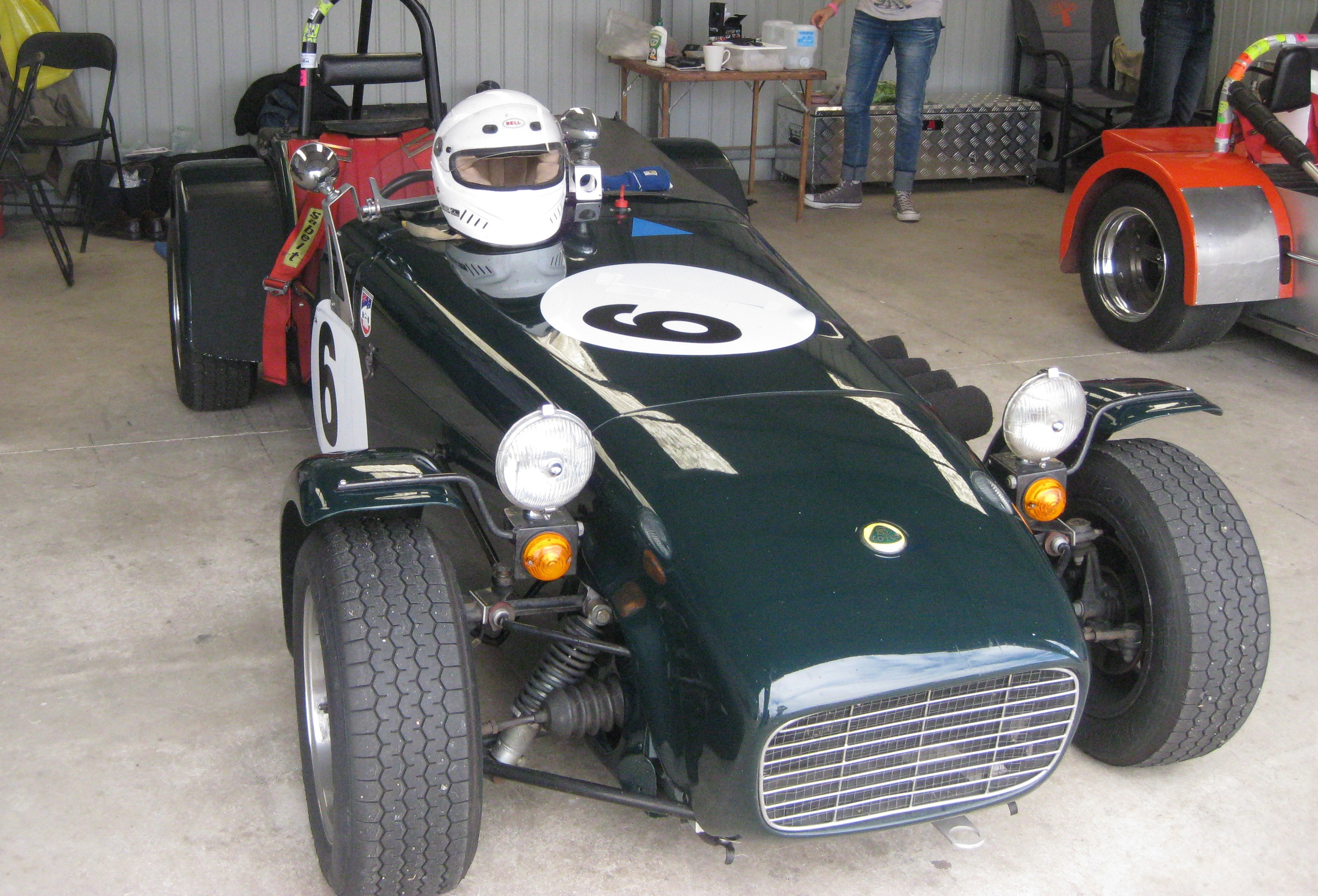
The winning Lotus Super 7, pictured in 2012

The 1963 Six Hour Le Mans was an endurance race for Sports Cars, Touring Cars & Grand Touring Cars. The race was held at the Caversham Airfield circuit in Western Australia on 3 June 1963. It was the ninth annual Six Hour Le Mans race.

The race was won by Jeff Dunkerton driving a Lotus Super 7. The winning car completed 194 laps, a total distance of 427 miles (688 km).

== Race results ==
Position	Drivers	No.	Car	Class	Class pos.	Laps
1	Jeff Dunkerton	26	Lotus Super 7	Sports Cars 1101 to 1600cc	1	194
2	Mike Tighe	47	Fiat 1500	Touring Cars 1301 to 1600cc	1	186
3	Mike Hurst, Dick Ward	2	Austin-Healey Sprite	Sports Cars 751 to 1100cc	1	180
4	Bruce Harding	84	Holden	Touring Cars 2001 to 2600cc	1	178
5	David Thomas, Ian Durrant	110	Morris Cooper	Touring Cars 751 to 1000cc	1	178
6	Owen Stringer, Bill Humble	62	Morris Cooper			178
7	Jack Wynhoff, Don Baker	106	Renault R8	Grand Touring 751 to 1000cc	1	174
8	Bill Inwood	44	Simca Montlhéry	Grand Touring 1001 to 1300cc	1	172
9	Roy Bolton	111	Vauxhall VX4/90			171
10	Dave Sullivan	40	Studebaker Lark	Touring Cars Over 2600cc	1	169
11	B McKay	76	Peugeot			168
12	Bill Downey, Stuart Campbell	7	Hillman Minx			167
13	Lionel Beattie, Jack Ayres	9	Repco-Holden	Sports Cars 2001 to 3000cc	1	166
14	Terry Cunliffe, Warren Matthews	54	Simca	Touring Cars 1001 to 1300cc	1	163
15	Max Butt, Lloyd Trezise	109	Ford Anglia			162
16	Eddie Williams, Brian Lemon	49	Volkswagen			155
17	George Wakelin, Dave Williams	42	Holden	Grand Touring 2001 to 2600cc	1	155
18	John Wileyman, P Teede	107	Simca Aronde			153
19	Wally Knox, Alois Visich	72	Holden			150
20	Tom Rice, Dick Ward	36	Austin-Healey Sprite			148
21	David Sadique, Warren Matthews	100	Skoda Felicia			147
22	Bob Biltoft, Rod Mitchell	46	Peugeot Holden			144
23	Wally Higgs, Vin Smith	102	Austin Freeway			138
24	Dick Roberts, Bob Avery	70	Holden GT			132
25	Tim Bailey, Graham Purchas	51	Renault 750	Grand Touring Up to 750cc	1	130
26	Rod Donovan	52	Holden			106
27	Syd Negus	25	Plymouth Sports	Sports Cars Over 3000cc	1	65
28	Harley Pederick, Stan Starcevich	64	Holden			31
29	Dick Roberts, Bob Avery	104	Chrysler Valiant			29
DNF	Murray Thomas	103	Simca Aronde			133
DNF	Rod Cutting, Bruce Abbott	101	Holden			51
DNF	John Glasson	61	Datsun			38
DNF	Vic Watson, John Collins	65	Ford Custom 272			44
DNF	L Matthews, Giuseppe Fazio	106	Holden			16
