= 1968 Six Hour Le Mans =

The 1968 Six Hour Le Mans was an endurance motor race staged at the Caversham circuit in Western Australia on 3 June 1968. The race, which was open to Sports Cars, Improved Production Touring Cars and Series Production Touring Cars, was the 14th Six Hour Le Mans and the last to be held at Caversham.

The race was won by Fritz Kohout driving a Porsche 911S.

== Results ==
Pos.	Drivers	No.	Car	Entrant	Class	Class Pos.	Laps
1	Fritz Kohout, (Arthur Collett)	42	Porsche 911S		Series Production Touring 1501-2000 cc	1	194
2	Rick Lisle, John Harris	49	Morris Cooper S		Series Production Touring 1101-1500 cc	1	188
3	Colin Hall, Tony Hall	7	Holden		Sports 2501-3000 cc	1	181
4	Austin McCarthy, Kevin Holt	9	Holden FJ		Sports 2501-3000 cc	2	180
5	Neville Cooper, Max Fletcher	19	Fiat 125	Cecchele Motors	Sports 1501-2000 cc	1	179
=6	Bruce Jones, Bob Goddard	48	Renault R8 Gordini		Series Production Touring 1101-1500 cc	2	178
=6	John Bertina, Rod Lording	6	Holden		Sports Over 3000 cc	1	178
8	Gordon Mitchell, Ray Shaw	30	Austin-Healey Sprite		Sports 751-1100 cc	1	175
9	Neville Grigsby, Ross Bennett	39	Morris Cooper S		Improved Prouction Touring 751-1100 cc	1	172
10	Doug Mould, Jeff Dunkerton	38	Morris Cooper S		Improved Prouction Touring 1101-1500 cc	1	171
11	Dick Roberts	40	Chrysler Valiant V8		Improved Prouction Touring Over 3000 cc	1	171
12	J. Watson, G. Reynolds	45	Alfa Romeo Giulia Super		Series Production Touring 1501-2000 cc	2	171
13	Leo Stubber, Bob Kingsbury	18	Lotus Elan		Sports 1501-2000 cc	2	170
14	Barry Coleman	47	Isuzu Bellett		Series Production Touring 1101-1500 cc	3	166
15	Brian Cole, B. Cleaver	33	Austin-Healey Sprite		Sports 751-1100 cc	2	163
16	Les Brockwell	20	Lotus Anglia		Sports 1501-2000 cc	3	162
17	Rod Waller, Bob Webb	8	Holden Sports		Sports 2501-3000 cc	3	160
18	Mal McKiggan	51	Fiat 850		Series Production Touring 751-1100 cc	1	160
19	Rod Mitchell	12	Peugeot		Sports 2000-2500 cc	1	159
20	Ken Glasgow	52	Morris Minor		Improved Prouction Touring 751-1100 cc	2	152
21	Ray Johnson, P. Dover	35	Holden		Improved Prouction Touring 2001-2500 cc	1	150
22	Norm Scott	21	Peugeot				149
23	Rod Donovan	41	Ford Falcon GT		Series Production Touring Over 3000 cc	1	147
24	B. Thompson, J. Collins	29	Renault Dauphine		Sports 1001-1500 cc	1	145
25	John Collins, J. Currie, R. Biltoff	15	Holden		Sports 2000-2500 cc	2	132
26	Warren Matthews, B. Wilkie	25	RE Ford		Sports 1001-1500 cc	2	123
DNF	Noel Mitchell	24	Ford Cortina SL				156
DNF	Peter Briggs, Jim Mullins	17	MGB				146
DNF	Owen Stringer	50	Morris Cooper S				140
DNF	John Roxburgh, Doug Whiteford	16	Datsun 2000				84
DNF	T. Lunt, G. Herbert	32	MG Midget				79
DNF	R. Craig, I. Leslie	43	Ford Cortina Lotus				79
DNF	Derek Vince, J. Lee	23	Elfin				74
DNF	Gordon Stephenson	36	Alfa Romeo GTA				71
DNF	Ted Lisle, Howie Sangster, N. Scott	37	Morris Cooper S				58
DNF	Mrs Marg Scott, Mrs D. McCarthy	34	NSU Prinz				51
DNF	Peter Bullen, Barry Arnold	5	Hurricane V8				49
DNF	Chris Royston, John Alford	22	Morris Cooper S				37
DNF	Jim Cavanough	10	Holden				21
DNF	Vic Watson	3	Goblin V8				19
DNF	Bob Annear, P. Dorn	27	Phoenix				13
DNF	Bob Biltoft, Warren Matthews	11	Ford Le Mon				12
DNF	Don O'Sullivan, Ted Lisle	1	Lola T70 Mk 2				4
DNF	John Glasson	4	Rambler Sports				2

=== Notes ===
- Starters: 44
- Finishers: 26
