= 1966 Le Mans 6 Hour Race =

1966 Australian vehicular endurance race

The 1966 Le Mans 6 Hour Race was an endurance race for Sports Cars, Improved Production Touring Cars and Series Production Touring Cars. It was held at the Caversham Circuit in Western Australia on 6 June 1966 over a six-hour duration. The race, which was the twelfth Six Hour Le Mans race, was won by Ron Thorp driving an AC Cobra 289.

== Results ==
Position	Drivers	No.	Car	Class	Class pos.	Laps
1	Ron Thorp	2	AC Cobra 289	Sports	1	202
2	Ted Lisle		Morris Cooper S	Improved	1	196
3	Stan Starcevich	5	Holden EH Special S4	Improved	2	194
4	Gordon Stephenson, Neville Cooper		Alfa Romeo Giulia GT Veloce	Improved		191
?	Dick Roberts		Chrysler Valiant			
?	Dave Thomas		Morris Mini	Series	1	
20	Cumper	50	Peugeot 403			
?	Taylor		Triumph TR4			
?	David Rockford		Holden GT			
?	Owen Stringer		Ford Cortina Mk1			
?	Bertina		Holden FJ "X2"	Sports		
?	Cuncliffe, Biltoft		Peugeot Sports	Sports		
?	Chapman, Sherrell		Triumph "TR3A"			
?	Muhling		Morris Mini			
?	Mould		Morris Mini			
?	Urquhart		Lotus Super Seven			
?	Rod Donovan	30	Holden 48/215			
DNF	Maslin, Williams		Renault			
DNF	Roger Fielding		Triumph TR4			
DNF	Brockwell, Mitchell		Ford Anglia			
DNF	O'Sullivan, Downey		Ford Cortina GT500			
DNF	Annear		Phoenix			
DNF	Fry		Morris Cooper S			
DNF	Scott		Peugeot			
DNF	Andy Buchanan		Ferrari 250LM			76
DNF	Vince, Charnley		Elfin	Sports		
DNF	Max McCracken, Smith		Lotus Elite	Sports		
DNF	Malcolm Seaward		Triumph 2000			
DNF	J. Sinclair		Austin-Healey Sprite			

24 cars finished the race from a field of 44 starters.
