= Six Hour Le Mans =

Layout of the Wanneroo Park, which held the race in 1969–1972

The Six Hour Le Mans was an endurance motor race for sports cars and touring cars held annually in Western Australia, Australia from 1955 to 1972.

Initially run at the Caversham Airfield circuit, the event was moved, along with all other WA circuit racing, to the then new Wanneroo Raceway in 1969.

== Winners ==
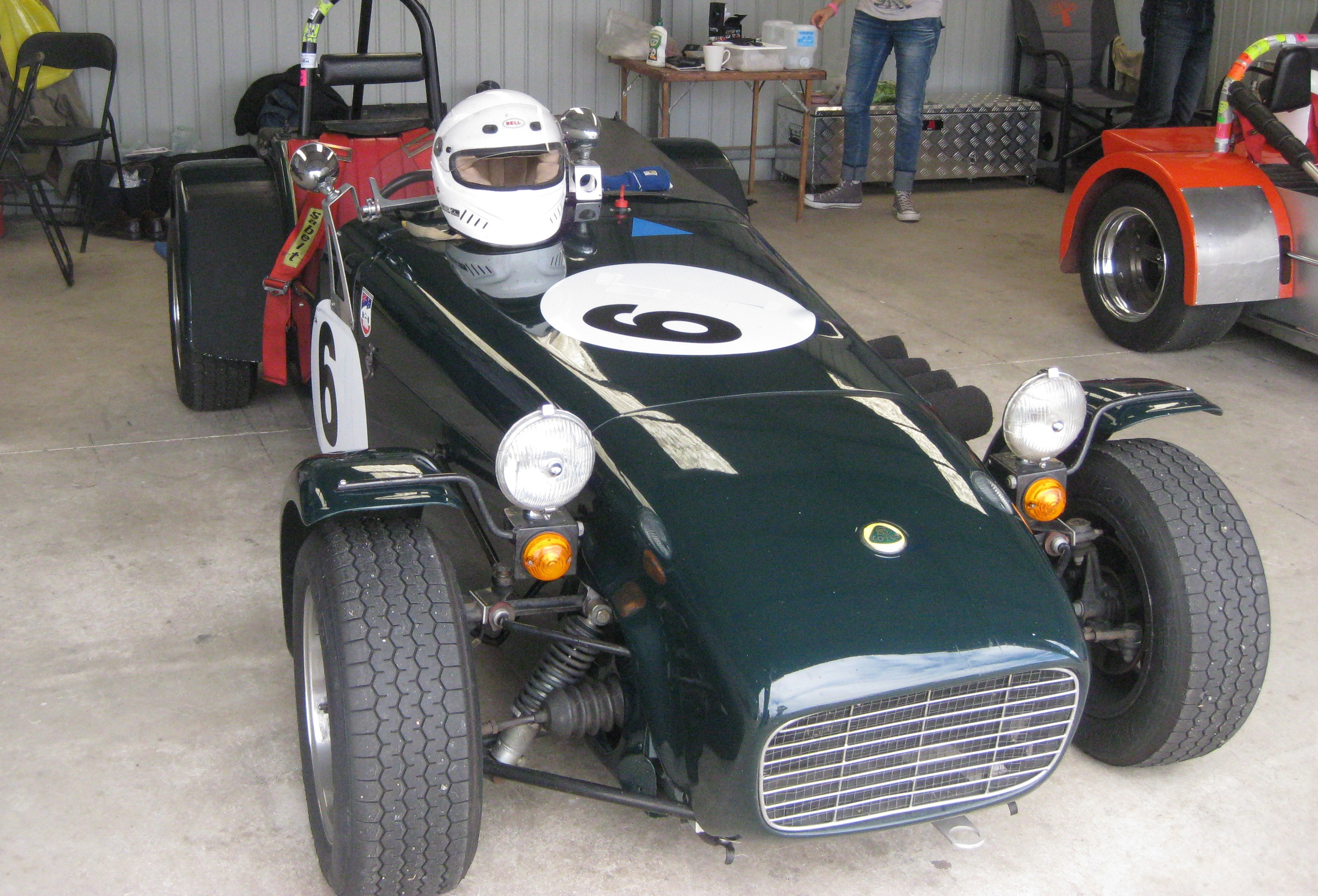
The Lotus Super 7 in which Jeff Dunkerton won the 1963 Six Hour Le Mans. The car is pictured in 2012.

1955	Sydney Anderson / Sid Taylor	Austin-Healey 100M
1956	Sydney Anderson / Sid Taylor	Austin-Healey 100
1957	Sydney Anderson / Sid Taylor	Austin-Healey 100-4
1958	Jim Harwood / Bill Downey	Triumph TR2
1959	Clem Dwyer / Vin Smith	Triumph TR3
1960	Jack Ayers / Lionel Beattie	Holden Sports
1961	Ray Barfield	Aston Martin DB3S
1962	Derek Jolly / John Roxburgh	Lotus 15 Coventry Climax
1963	Jeff Dunkerton	Lotus Super 7
1964	Harley Pederick / Stan Starcevich	Jaguar E-type
1965	Spencer Martin / David McKay	Ferrari 250LM
1966	Ron Thorp	AC Cobra 289
1967	Jeff Dunkerton / Doug Mould	Morris Cooper S
1968	Fritz Kohout	Porsche 911S
1969	Don O'Sullivan / Frank Matich	Lola T70
1970	Don O'Sullivan / Howie Sangster	Lola T70 Mk. II
1971	Ray Thackwell, Jim Mullins	Porsche 911S
1972	Ray Thackwell, Jim Mullins	Porsche 911S
