= Mooliabeenee, Western Australia =

Mooliabeenee
- Suburb
- Coordinates: 31°20′16″S 116°0′55″E
- Country: Australia
- State: Western Australia
- LGA(s): Shire of Chittering

Government
  - State electorate(s): Moore
  - Federal division(s): Durack

Area
  - Total: 106 km^{2} (41 sq mi)

Population
  - Total(s): 213 (SAL 2021)

Mooliabeenee (also found misspelt as Mooliabeenie) is a locality in Western Australia, east of Gingin, within the Shire of Chittering.

The nearby Mooliabeenie (Note: The station was originally spelt Mooliabeenee but the spelling changed c. 1965.) station lies on the Millendon Junction (near Midland) to Dongara section of the railway line now managed by Arc Infrastructure. It was originally built in 1894 as part of the Midland Railway.

Also nearby is a disused 1,500 m (4,900 ft) long airstrip which was used by the United States Army Air Corps during World War II and associated with the Caversham Airfield at Middle Swan. Like the Caversham Airfield, the Mooliabeenee Airfield was later used as a motor racing track. Local car clubs regularly use the site for motorkhana events.

== See also ==
- List of airports in Victoria
- Aviation transport in Australia
