= 1971 TVW Channel 7 6 Hour Le Mans =

Layout of the Wanneroo Park

The TVW Channel 7 6 Hour Le Mans was motor race staged at the Wanneroo Park Circuit in Western Australia on 7 June 1971. It was the 17th “Six Hour Le Mans” race to be held in Western Australia and the third to be staged at Wanneroo Park. The race was won by Ray Thackwell and Jim Mullins driving a Porsche 911S.

== Groups ==
Cars competed in three Groups:

- Group A Sports Cars and Clubman
- Group C Improved Production Touring Cars
- Group E Series Production Touring Cars

== Results ==
Position	Drivers	No.	Car	Entrant	Group Pos.	Group	Laps
1	Ray Thackwell, Jim Mullins	4	Porsche 911S	R Thackwell	1	C	282
2	Peter Doney, Paul Wilkins	9	Morris Cooper S	P Doney	2	C	265
3	Stan Starcevich, Stuart Kostera, Ron Bairstow	2	Graduate	S Starcevich	1	A	265
4	Gordon Leney, Dave Sullivan Jnr	20	Holden LC Torana GTR-XU1	G Leney	1	E	261
5	Bill Russell, John Alford	19	Datsun 2000 SR 311	W Russell	2	A	261
6	Gordon Mitchell, Alan Richards	6	Austin-Healey Sprite Mark 1	G Mitchell	3	A	257
7	Barry Coleman, Graeme Ashdown	25	Morris Cooper S	B Coleman	2	E	248
8	Rod Collins, Stan Starcevich	10	Ford XW Falcon GTHO	Anderson Ford	3	E	248
9	Mal McKiggan, Les Verco	32	Mazda Capella RE				244
10	Richard Williamson, John Farrell	23	Holden LC Torana GTR-XU1				240
11	Colin Hall, Anthony Hall	17	Holden LC Torana GTR-XU1				235
12	Stephen Bruce, David McBean	35	Morris Cooper S				231
13	Geoff Abbott, Kim Abbott	14	Holden LC Torana GTR-XU1				230
14	Leo Stubber, Bob Kingsbury	12	Porsche 911S	L Stubber	3	C	229
15	Dennis Knox, Ross McGregor	36	Vauxhall Viva				212
16	Don Hall, Lindsay Derriman	27	Datsun 1600				211
17	Murray Thomas, Tim Garrett	38	Volkswagen				209
18	Tony McAlinden, Colin Weir	16	U2 Mk 8B				200
19	Bill Maddocks, Valerie Maddocks	33	Mini Monaco				198
20	Ean Hill, John Hill	18	RE Ford				183
21	Jack Kennedy, Terry Lyons	21	Morris Cooper				180
DNF	Dick Murphy, Noel Mitchell	3	Bolwell Mark 7				218
DNF	Andrew Lewis, Roly Richardson	37	Holden FJ				122
DNF	Mit Vaughan, Daryl Manning, Alan Stean	34	Austin-Healey Sprite				116
DNF	Howie Sangster, Don O'Sullivan	1	Lola T70 Mk 2				111
DNF	Basil Ricciardello, Bernie Zampatti	15	Alfa Romeo GTA				107
DNF	Greame Ibbotson, George Cole	8	Jomax Ford	Snob Boutique			105
DNF	Nigel Barter, Peter Green	11	Holden LC Torana GTR-XU1				95
DNF	John Lowe, Brian Rhodes	26	Ford Escort Twin Cam				86
DNF	Rick Lisle, Anne Wong	7	Morris Cooper S				73
DNF	John Haynes, Ray Tyler	24	Morgan +4				38

Pole position was attained by Howie Sangster with a lap time of 1:02.0

There were 31 starters in the event.
