= 1970 TVW Channel 7 Six Hour Le Mans =

Layout of the Wanneroo Park

The 1970 TVW Channel 7 Six Hour Le Mans was an endurance race for Sports Cars, Improved Production Touring Cars & Series Production Touring Cars. The event was held at the Wanneroo Park circuit in Western Australia on 1 June 1970 with forty cars lining up for the modified Le Mans type start. Results for the race are shown below.

Position	Drivers	No.	Car	Entrant	Laps
1	Don O'Sullivan, Howie Sangster	2	Lola T70 Mk. II	Pinocchio's Racing Team	287
2	Stan Starcevich, Stuart Kostera	3	Graduate Mk. II	S Starcevich	277
3	Teddy Yip, Henry Lee	5	Lotus 47	T Yip	272
4	John Trowell, Don Hall	6	Lotus Elan	J Trowell	272
5	Ray Thackwell, Jim Mullins	10	Morris Cooper S	Jim Mullins Tuning	267
6	Dick Murphy, John Glasson	14	Bolwell Mk. 7	R Murphy	250
7	Basil Ricciardello, Bernie Zampatti	18	Alfa Romeo GTA	B Ricciardello	249
8	Dave Sullivan Jnr, Dave Sullivan Snr	12	U2 Mk. 8	D Sullivan Jnr.	243
9	Bill Russell, Tony Crowder	31	Datsun SR 311	W Russell	240
10	Nigel Barter, P Green	28	Morris Cooper S	N Barter	240
	Sports Cars Under 1100cc				
1	Jim Brewer, Tony McAlinden	36	Ford Anglia		
2	Gordon Mitchell, Alan Richards	22	Austin-Healey Sprite		
	Sports Cars 1101-1500cc				
1	Dave Sullivan Jnr, Dave Sullivan Snr	12	U2 Mk. 8	D Sullivan Jnr.	243
2	Don Baker, Judith Baker	33	Lotus Super 7		
3	Murray Charnely, D Vince	25	Lotus 23		
	Sports Cars 1501-2000cc				
1	Teddy Yip, Henry Lee	5	Lotus 47	T Yip	272
2	John Trowell, Don Hall	6	Lotus Elan	J Trowell	272
3	Bill Russell, Tony Crowder	31	Datsun SR 311	W Russell	240
	Sports Cars 2001-3000cc				
1	Bob Corbett, A Steen	23	Triumph TR5		
2	Mike Francis, Laurie Egan	32	Holden		
3	Rod Lording, Kim Ledger	39	Holden		
	Sports Cars 30001-5000cc				
1	Don O'Sullivan, Howie Sangster	2	Lola T70 Mk. II	Pinocchio's Racing Team	287
2	Stan Starcevich, Stuart Kostera	3	Graduate Mk. II	S Starcevich	277
3	Dick Murphy, John Glasson	14	Bolwell Mk. 7	R Murphy	250
	Improved Touring Cars 1101-1500cc				
1	Ray Thackwell, Jim Mullins	10	Morris Cooper S	Jim Mullins Tuning	267
2	Rick Lisle, John Alford	9	Morris Cooper S	Shell Racing Team	
3	Bill Nuske, Rick Henderson	34	Morris Cooper S		
	Improved Touring Cars 1501-2000cc				
1	Basil Ricciardello, Bernie Zampatti	18	Alfa Romeo GTA	B Ricciardello	249
	Improved Touring Cars 2001-3000cc				
1	Phillip Brodie-Hall, John Evans	29	Holden HR		
	Improved Touring Cars 3001-5000cc				
	No Starters				
	Improved Touring Cars Over 5000cc				
1	Tim White, William Lee	19	Ford Falcon GTHO		
	Series Touring Cars Under 1100cc				
	No Finishers				
	Series Touring Cars 1101-1500cc				
1	Nigel Barter, P Green	28	Morris Cooper S	N Barter	240
2	David Hipperson, Jeff Power	30	Morris Cooper S		
3	Tom Burge, Lance Barrett	38	Morris Cooper S		
	Series Touring Cars 1501-2000cc				
1	Leo Stubber, Bob Kingsbury	20	Porsche 911S		
	Other known starters				
	Dick Roberts, Rod Donovan	15	Holden Monaro		
	Bob Holden, Rodney Collins	4	Ford Escort Twin Cam		
DNF	Peter Briggs, Craig MacAllister	8	Morris Cooper S		
	Owen Stringer, Noel Mitchell	24	Ford Cortina SL		
	Graeme Ibbotson, Ross Hogben	7	Jomax Ford	Snob Boutique	
	Neil Moore, Peter Stanley	11	Morris Cooper S		
DNF	Leon Shenton, Jan Shenton	16	Morris Cooper S		
	David Bell, Clive Head	37	Morris 850		
	Jack Kennedy, Bernie Zampatti	17	Morris Cooper Sports		
	Alan Macdonald, Colin Cleaver	41	MGB		
	Mal McKiggan, George Cole	44	Toyota Corolla SL		
	Les Verco, Roy Prout	21	Holden		
