= 1969 TVW Channel 7 Le Mans 6 Hour Race =

Layout of the Wanneroo Park

The 1969 TVW Channel 7 Le Mans 6 Hour Race was an endurance race for Open and Closed Sports Cars, Improved Production Touring Cars and Series Production Touring Cars. The event was staged on 2 June 1969 at the Wanneroo Park circuit in Western Australia. It was the 14th Le Mans 6 Hour Race to be held in Western Australia and the first to be held at Wanneroo Park.

== Results ==
Position	Drivers	No.	Car	Entrant	Category	Class	Laps
1	Don O'Sullivan, Frank Matich	1	Lola T70 Mk 2	Don O'Sullivan Racing	Sports Cars	SC 3001-5000cc	276
2	Peter Briggs, Doug Mould	17	Morris Cooper S	Briggs Developments	Sports Cars	SC 1100-1500cc	276
3	Fritz Kahout, Stan Starcevich	4	Porsche 911S	Fritz Kahout	Improved Production	IP 1501-2000cc	275
4	Dick Murphy, John Glasson	9	Bolwell Mk 7	Cannington Auto Spares	Sports Cars	SC 3001-5000cc	253
5	Noel Mitchell, Owen Stringer	20	Ford Cortina SL	BP Hamilton Hill	Sports Cars	SC 1100-1500cc	247
6	Rick Lisle, Neville Grigsby	15	Morris Cooper S	John Harris Team	Improved Production	IP 1101-1500cc	245
7	Don Hall, Brian Davies	6	Lotus Europa		Sports Cars	SC 1100-1500cc	244
8	Peter Bullen, Barry Arnold	26	Hurricane V8		Sports Cars	SC 3001-5000cc	235
9	David Rockford, Colin Hall	23	Holden Monaro GTS 186		Series Production	SP 3001-5000cc	234
10	Dick Roberts, Rod Donovan	11	Holden Monaro GTS 327		Improved Production	IP Over 3000cc	231
11	Jeff Dunkerton, Chris Royston	39	Morris Mini K		Series Production	SP Under 1100cc	229
12	Mal McKiggan, George Cole	41	Toyota Corolla Sprinter		Series Production	SP Under 1100cc	229
13	Warran Matthews, Bob Wilkie	21	RE Ford		Sports Cars	SC 1101-1500cc	217
14	Manfred Keune, Rod Waller	40	Austin-Healey Sprite		Sports Cars	SC Under 1100cc	209
15	Bill Lee, Bill Downey	43	Holden HD		Improved Production	IP 2001-3000cc	206
16	Dave Watkins, Graeme Jefferson	22	Morris Cooper S		Series Production	SP 1101-1500cc	205
NC	Robert Elsbury, Ian Wilkie	33	Holden HR		Improved Production	IP 3001-5000cc	183
NC	Les Verco, Roy Prout	30	Holden		Sports Cars	SC 2001-3000cc	167
NC	Jack Kennedy, Bernie Zampatti	37	Mini		Sports Cars	SC 2001-3000cc	149
NC	John Evans, Barry Coleman	34	Isuzu Bellett		Improved Production	IP 1101-1500cc	137
NC	Graeme Ibbotson, Chris Henn	5	Jomax Ford		Sports Cars	SC 1100-1500cc	120
NC	Rod Lording, Barry Coleman	28	Holden		Sports Cars	SC 3001-5000cc	107
DNF	Jum Currie, Brian Thompson	29	Holden		Sports Cars	SC 3001-5000cc	222
DNF	Gordon Mitchell, Alan Richards	31	Austin-Healey Sprite		Sports Cars	SC Under 1100cc	222
DNF	John Bertina, Con Bertina	7	Holden Sports		Sports Cars	SC 3001-5000cc	220
DNF	Jim Mullins, Howie Sangster	14	Morris Cooper S		Improved Production	IP 1101-1500cc	184
DNF	Ron Bairstow, Jack Kennedy	45	Honda N600		Series Production	SP Under 1100cc	143
DNF	Leon Shenton, Jan Shenton	16	Morris Cooper S		Improved Production	IP 1101-1500cc	141
DNF	Rod Collins, Mark Staniford, Peter Briggs	12	Cooper Climax Sports		Sports Cars	SC 1100-1500cc	123
DNF	Wayne Negus, Terry Power	25	Morris Mini Deluxe		Sports Cars	SC Under 1100cc	121
DNF	Bob Webb, Bob Kingsbury	10	Holden Sports		Sports Cars	SC 3001-5000cc	112
DNF	Robert Corbett, Trevor Lunt	8	Triumph TR5		Sports Cars	SC 2001-3000cc	106
DNF	Stan Starcevich, Stuart Kostera	2	Graduate Ford		Sports Cars	SC 3001-5000cc	94
DNF	Ken Glasgow, Tom Dines	42	Morris Minor 1000		Sports Cars	SC Under 1100cc	73
DNF	Bob Biltoft, Rod Mitchell	32	Holden Le Mon		Sports Cars	SC 2001-3000cc	37
DNF	Gordon Stephenson, Neville Cooper	3	Alfa Romeo GTA		Improved Production	IP 1501-2000cc	31
DNF	Peter Dover, Ray Johnson	36	Holden		Sports Cars	SC 2001-3000cc	30

Note: Cars which were still running at the end of the six hours but covered less than 184 laps (two thirds winner’s distance) were not classified as finishers.
