= 1965 Six Hour Le Mans =

Endurance car race in Western Australia

The 1965 Six Hour Le Mans was an endurance race open to Sports Cars, Improved Production Touring Cars & Series Production Touring Cars. The event was staged at the Caversham circuit in Western Australia on 7 June 1965. Results were as follows:

Position	Drivers	No.	Car	Entrant	Laps
1	Spencer Martin; David McKay	1	Ferrari 250LM	Scuderia Veloce	223
2	Ron Thorp	2	AC Cobra 289		211
3	Vic Watson; Dave Sullivan	5	Hurricane V8		200
4	Max McCrackan; Vin Smith	7	Lotus Elite		200
5	Ted Lisle; Mike Tighe	33	Morris Cooper S		193
6	P Capelli; Rick Lisle	36	Morris Cooper		188
Sports Cars 751-1100cc
1	Gary Griffiths; Jeff Dunkerton	25	Austin-Healey Sprite		159
DNF	Nev McBeth; Dick Ward	26	Austin-Healey Sprite		
DNF	Don Noack; Rod Slater	24	Renault 750		
Sports Cars 1101-1500cc
1	Max McCrackan; Vin Smith	7	Lotus Elite		200
2	Jeff Dunkerton	4	Lotus Super 7		132
3	Don Baker	23	Volkswagen		122
DNF	Warren Mathews; Lou Orton	22	Volkswagen		
DNF	Derek Vince; Jack Ayers	8	Elfin		27
DNF	J Malhoney	21	Triumph Spitfire		27
Sports Cars 1501-2000cc
1	J Bavera; R Mitchell	17	MGB		189
2	Bob Biltoff; T Barlow	9	Porsche Super 90		166
3	R Britton	18	MGA		121
Sports Cars 2001-3000cc
1	Bill Dickson; R Fielding	14	Holden		186
2	P Wilkins; G Abbott	12	Triumph TR4		184
3	J Lewis; D McKay	29	Holden		130
DNF	Rod Donovan	11	Holden		82
DNF	Rod Waller, Lionel Beattie	6	Repco Holden Sports		72
DNF	John Glasson	10	Atlantis		13
Sports Cars Over 3000cc
1	Spencer Martin; David McKay	1	Ferrari 250LM	Scuderia Veloce	223
2	Ron Thorp	2	AC Cobra 289		211
3	Vic Watson; Dave Sullivan	5	Hurricane V8		200
Improved Production Touring Cars 751-1100cc
1	Ted Lisle; Mike Tighe	33	Morris Cooper S		193
2	P Capelli; Rick Lisle	36	Morris Cooper		188
3	Stuart Kostera; Derek Fletcher	39	Ford Anglia		183
Improved Production Touring Cars 1101-1500cc
1	Max Butt; G Glatz	35	Ford Cortina		184
2	Ross Urquhart; Craig McAllister	34	Ford Cortina		170
DNF	Owen Stringer; M Tighe	32	Ford Cortina GT		152
DNF	Don O'Sullivan; R McDowell	33	Ford Cortina GT		6
Improved Production Touring Cars 2001-3000cc
1	J Piesse; H Vander Straaten	37	Holden		180
Improved Production Touring Cars Over 3000cc
1	Dick Roberts	30	Chrysler Valiant		119
Series Production Touring Cars 751-1100cc
1	H De Klerk; M Cliff	42	Morris Cooper		176
DNF	D Black; J Brewer	45	Vauxhall Viva		16
Series Production Touring Cars 1101-1500cc
1	Leon Shenton; T Cuncliffe	44	Simca		166
Series Production Touring Cars 2000-3000cc
1	John Hughes; D Black	40	Holden		168
