= Austin-Healey 100-6 =

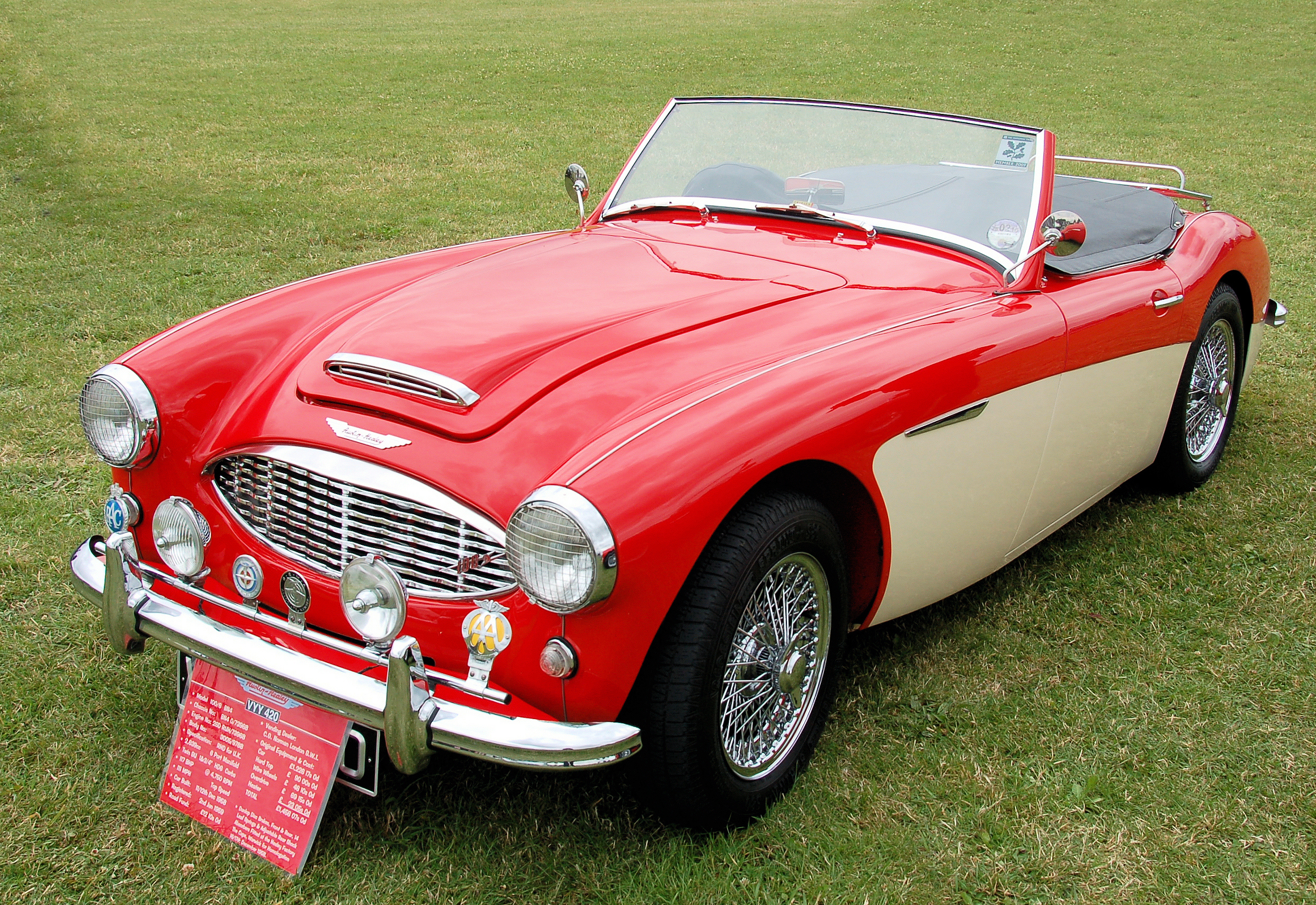

Overview
- Manufacturer: Austin-Healey (BMC)
- Production: 1956–1959
- Assembly: United Kingdom: Abingdon, England; United Kingdom: Longbridge, England (Longbridge plant)

Powertrain
- Engine: 2639 cc C-Series I6

Dimensions
- Wheelbase: 92 in (2,337 mm)
- Length: 157.5 in (4,000 mm)
- Width: 60 in (1,524 mm)
- Height: 50 in (1,270 mm)

Chronology
- Predecessor: Austin-Healey 100
- Successor: Austin-Healey 3000

The Austin-Healey 100-6 is a two-seat roadster that was announced in late September 1956 and produced from 1956 until 1959. A replacement for the Austin-Healey 100, it was followed by the Austin-Healey 3000; together, the three models have become known as the Big Healeys.

The 100-6 featured a 2 in (50.8 mm) longer wheelbase than the 100, a more powerful straight-six engine in place of its slightly larger inline-four, and added two occasional seats (which later became optional). The body lines were slightly streamlined, a smaller, wider radiator grille placed lower, an air scoop was added to the bonnet, and the windscreen fixed.

The 100-6 was produced in two model designators, the 2+2 BN4 from 1956 onwards and the 2-seat BN6 in 1958–9.

The cars used a tuned version of the BMC C-Series engine previously fitted to the Austin Westminster, initially producing 102 bhp (76 kW) and increased in 1957 to 117 bhp (87 kW) by fitting a revised manifold and cylinder head. The previously standard overdrive unit was made optional.

In late 1957 production was transferred from Longbridge to the MG plant at Abingdon. 14,436 100-6s were produced before production ended in 1959.

A 117 bhp (87 kW) BN6 was tested by The Motor magazine in 1959 had a top speed of 103.9 mph (167.2 km/h) and could accelerate from 0-60 mph (97 km/h) in 10.7 seconds. A fuel consumption of 20.8 miles per imperial gallon (13.6 L/100 km; 17.3 mpg_{‑US}) was recorded. The test car cost £1307 including taxes of £436.
