= Standing start =

Type of start in auto racing events

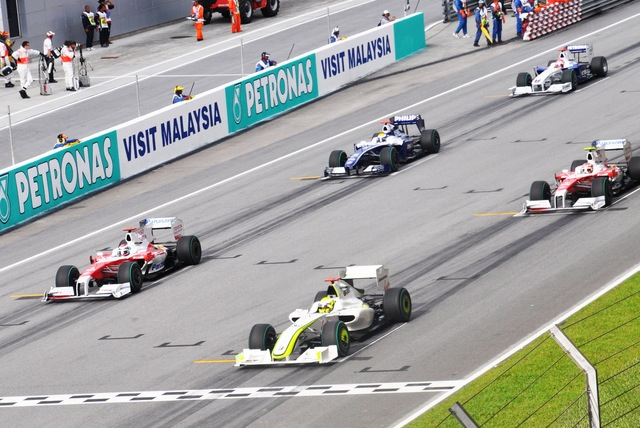
A standing start during the 2009 Malaysian Grand Prix.

A standing start is a type of start in auto racing events, in which cars are stationary when the race begins (different to the rolling start, where cars are paced). Some categories of land speed record also require a standing start, although the absolute land speed record uses a flying start, where the vehicle has reached its top speed by the starting point of the timer.

== Procedure ==
In a standing start, cars are completely still but with their engines running when the signal is given to start the race. This is often preceded by a set number of lights. Standing starts are common in many motorsports, including most single-seater (Formula 1 and Formula 2 notably), Touring Cars (most notably British and World Touring Cars), drag racing, the Supercars Championship, kart racing, and many types of short-course off-road racing. In a typical standing start, the formation lap takes place, giving time for team personnel to get clear of the starting grid and back into the pit boxes. Once the formation lap is over, all cars position themselves in the order that they qualified, and the Medical Car positions itself behind the pack. Once the Medical Car is in position, a light system consisting of five lights will be shown, and in the process, a marshall walks or runs across the grid while waving a green flag to signal that all cars are correctly positioned. After a predetermined number of seconds, the lights go out, and the race is underway. However, first-lap crashes are common.

American-based series such as IndyCar, NASCAR, and SCCA have traditionally utilized rolling starts. During the 2013 and 2014 seasons, the IndyCar Series adopted a rule for standing starts on a trial basis for selected events. IndyCar dropped the procedure after the 2014 season, due to numerous start aborts and a start-line crash at the 2014 Grand Prix of Indianapolis.

== Le Mans ==
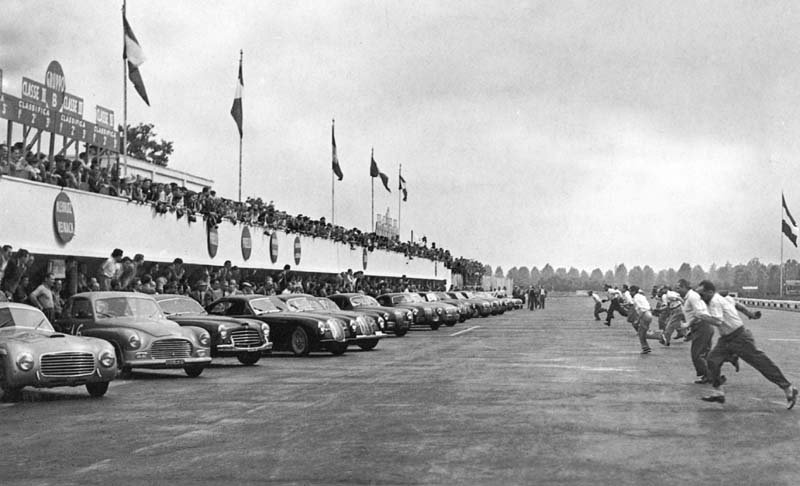
The Le Mans-style start of the 1949 Coppa Intereuropa, held at Monza

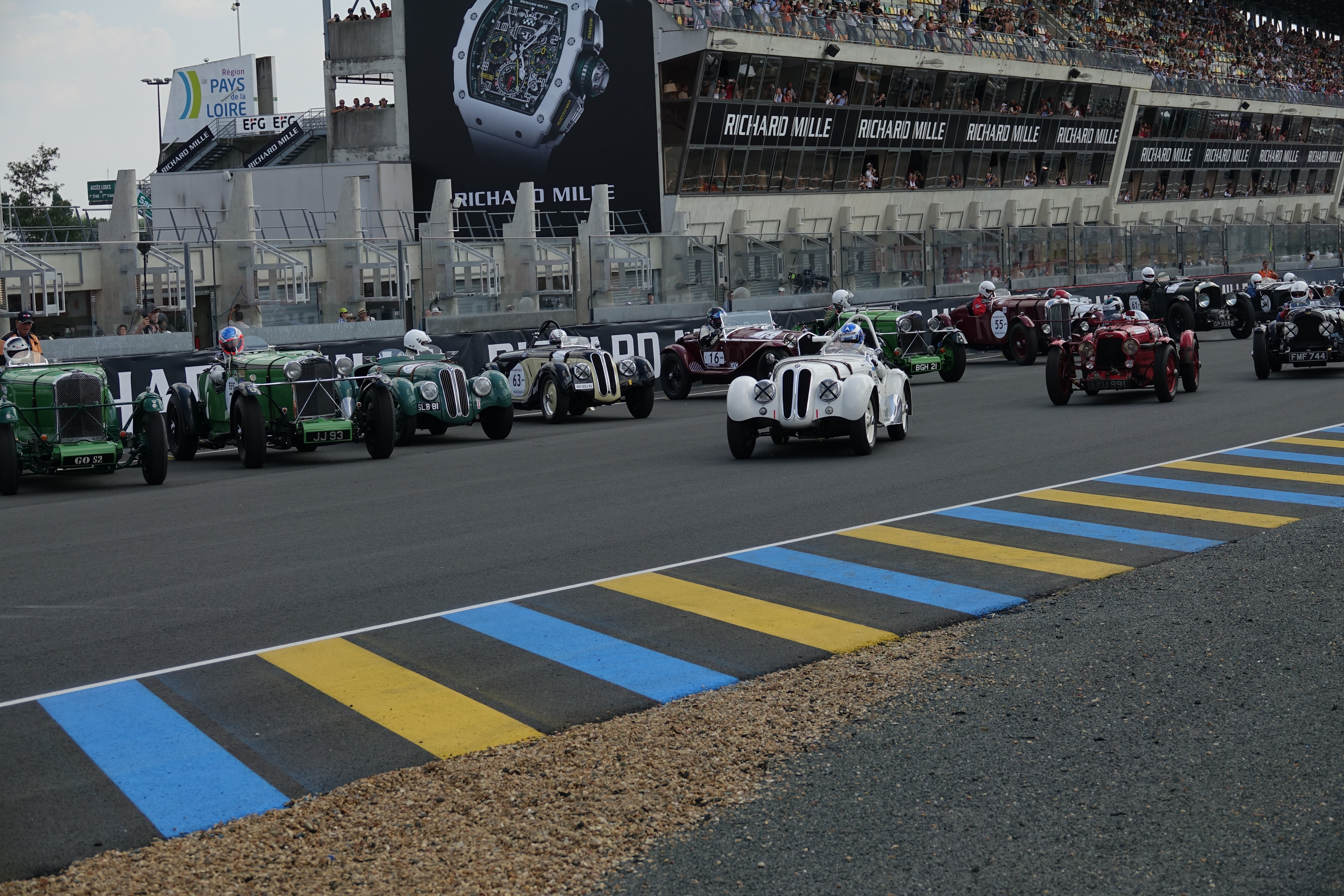
Le Mans-style start at Le Mans Classic in 2018.

A Le Mans-style start was used for many years in various types of motor racing. When the start flag dropped, drivers had to run across the track to their cars which were parked on the other side, climb in, start the car, and drive away to begin the race.

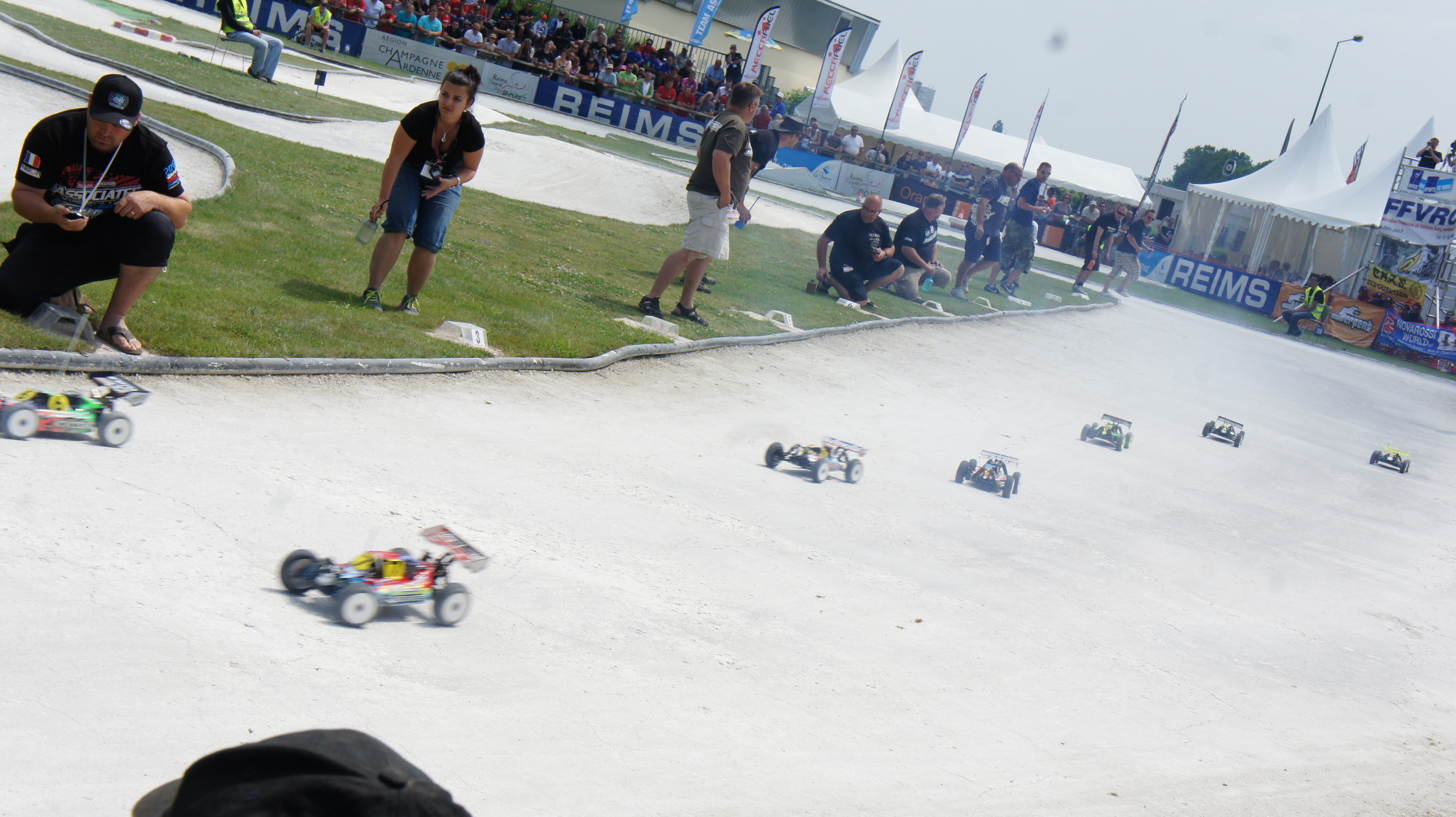
Cars starting from "launch point" at the 2013 EFRA European 1:8 IC Off-Road Championship.

Such starts were unsafe, with drivers usually postponing the donning of safety equipment such as seat belts and not checking their vehicles in order to drive as soon as possible. Drivers also ran the risk of colliding with other vehicles as they took off. Britain's RAC prohibited the use of the Le Mans start in English racing in late summer 1962 for this reason. At the 1969 24 hours of Le Mans, Jacky Ickx, who always considered this type of start to be dangerous, decided to walk to his car instead of running. Taking the time to secure everything made him effectively start in last position; however he still went on to win the race. Minutes later, John Woolfe died after crashing in the first lap at the Maison Blanche curve, as he did not fasten his seat belt prior to taking off. Both incidents led to the running start being abolished the following year. As a result, they are no longer used in any motorsport except for endurance motorcycle racing, such as the Suzuka 8 Hours and the 24 Heures Moto, bicycle endurance races, and (due to their vulnerability to flameouts), in nitro powered radio-controlled racing, except when they are held above the ground until race start by their mechanics.

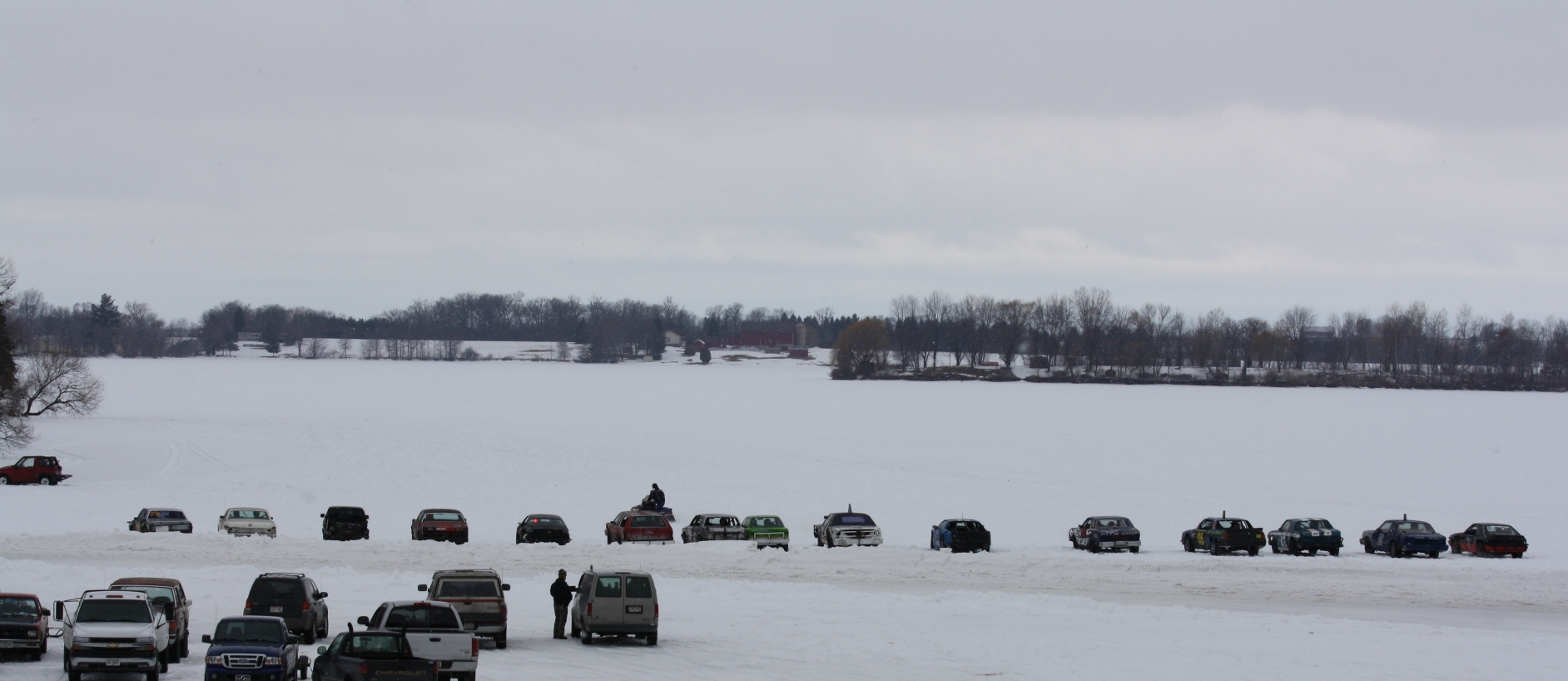
Land rush start (2010).

A Le Mans start variation called a "land rush start" is used at short course off-road races at Crandon International Off-Road Raceway, where the vehicles start lined up side-by-side on a wide part of the track. The "land rush start" is based on the 1970 24 Hours of Le Mans start, and is used in historic races at Le Mans in some situations. However, unlike the true Le Mans start, engines are already running and the drivers are already sitting behind the wheel, wearing their safety belts, when the starting signal is displayed.

A second variation is used in the endurance races at Highlands Motorsports Park in New Zealand that integrate the Le Mans start and the Land Rush start for multiple driver races. The primary drivers are in their cars at the start on pit lane, with the engines running, with each car having a flag attached to the rear of the cars. Co-drivers are positioned about 250 metres (820 ft) from their cars in uniform with a marshal next to them, lined up in qualifying order of their cars. At the signal from a starting pistol, the co-drivers make the run from the start line to their cars, pulling the flag from their car once they reach their respective cars, with the primary driver then moving the car only after the flag is pulled. Drivers must stay at pit speed limits until they exit pit lane.

== Safety and precautions ==
The alternative to a standing start is a rolling start. Standing starts are often deemed safer in Formula sports, due to the higher acceleration speeds, which could cause problems if a rolling start were used, based on the speed of the safety car and regulations regarding the start (some forms of motorsport are strict on when cars may accelerate after the safety car enters pit lane—some do not permit acceleration until the cars are near the start line at starter's orders). A standing start can cause problems, however, such as stalled cars being hit by drivers who start behind them on the grid. Riccardo Paletti was killed in just such an accident at the 1982 Canadian Grand Prix. Another example was the 2007 Champ Car Mont-Tremblant race, where multiple cars stalled on the start, resulting in a safety car. Motorsports using standing starts usually penalize drivers who "jump the start" by moving before the lights are extinguished.

== See also ==
- Rolling start
