= Austin-Healey =

Former British sports car maker

Austin-Healey was a British sports car maker established in 1952 through a joint venture between the Austin division of the British Motor Corporation (BMC) and the Donald Healey Motor Company (Healey), a renowned automotive engineering and design firm. Leonard Lord represented BMC and Donald Healey his firm.

BMC merged with Jaguar Cars in 1966 to form British Motor Holdings (BMH). Donald Healey left BMH in 1968 when it merged into British Leyland. Healey then joined Jensen Motors, which had been making bodies for the "big Healeys" since their inception in 1952, and became their chairman in 1972. Austin-Healey cars were produced until 1972 when the 20-year agreement between Healey and Austin came to an end.

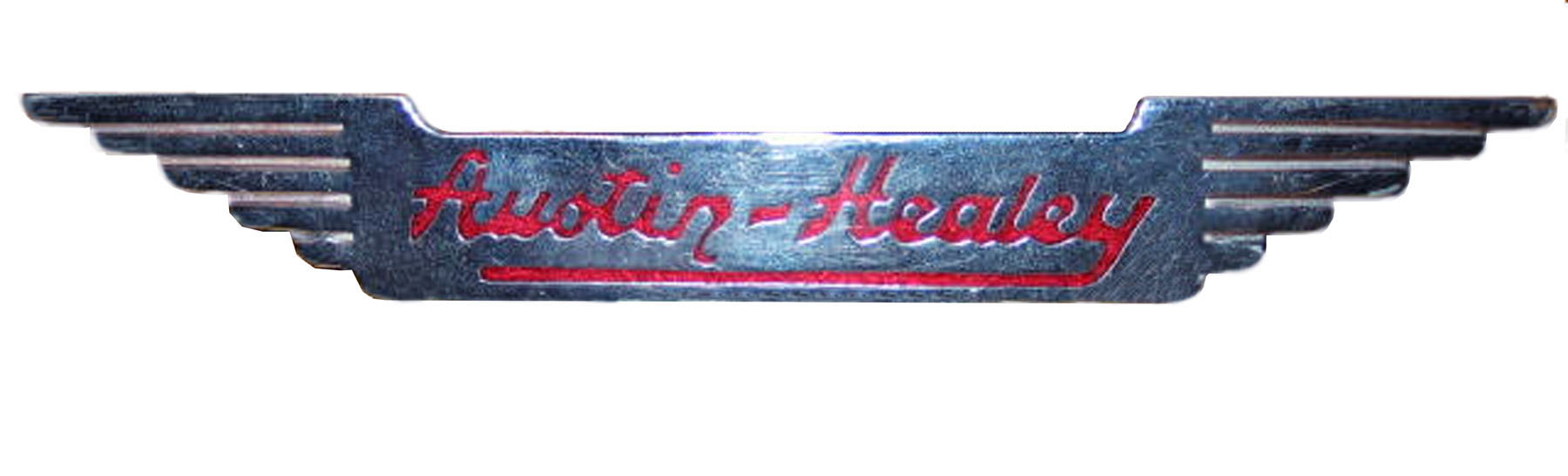
The Austin-Healey–inscribed badge placed on early models

== Models built ==
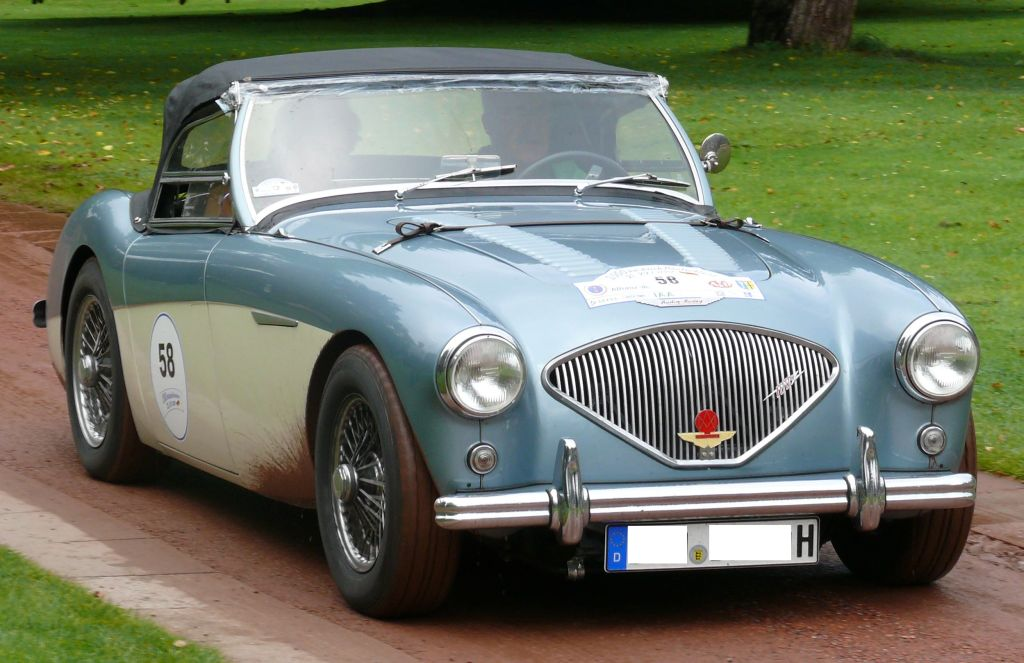
1956 Austin-Healey 100M BN2

=== Austin-Healey 100 ===
Open two-seater (minimal weather protection)

- 1953–1955 BN1 Austin-Healey 100
- 1955 Austin-Healey 100S (limited production—50 race-prepared cars)
- 1955–1956 BN2 Austin-Healey 100 and 100M

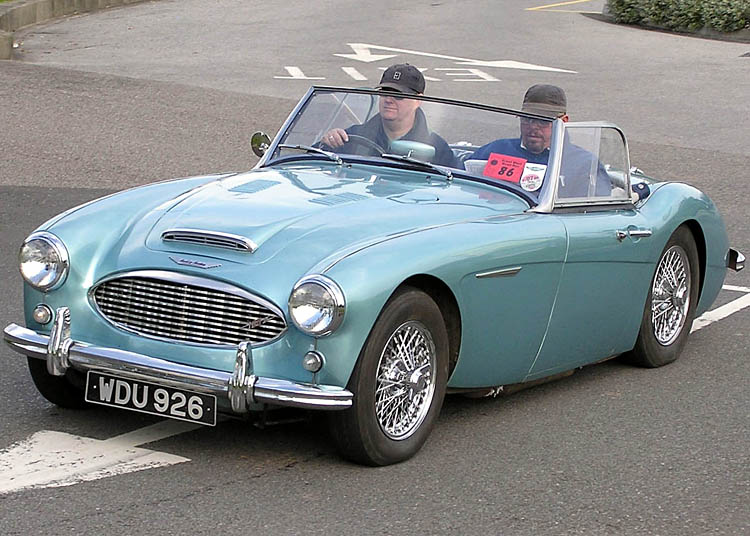
1958 Austin-Healey 100-6 BN4

=== Austin-Healey 100-6 ===
Open 2+2-seater

- 1956–1957 BN4 Austin-Healey 100-6 (2+2 roadster)
- 1957–1959 BN4 Austin-Healey 100-6 Change to 1 3/4-inch SU Carbs (2+2 roadster)
- 1958–1959 BN6 Austin-Healey 100-6 6-Cylinder (2-seater roadster)

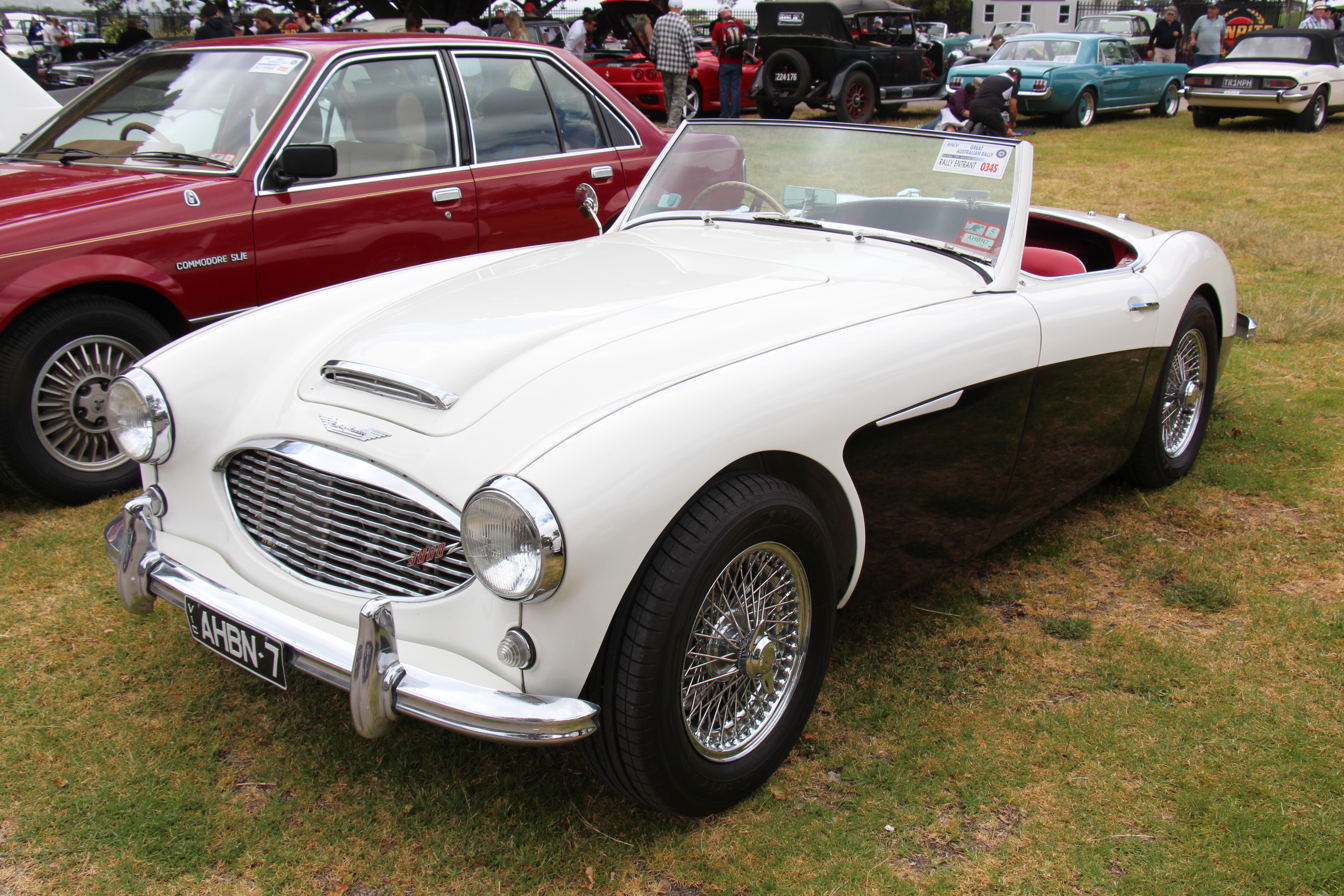
1959 Austin-Healey 3000 MkI BN7

=== Austin-Healey 3000 ===
Open 2+2-seater

- 1959–1961 BN7 Mark I (2-seater roadster), BT7 Mark I (2+2 roadster)
- 1961–1962 BN7 Mark II (2-seater roadster), BT7 Mark II (2+2)

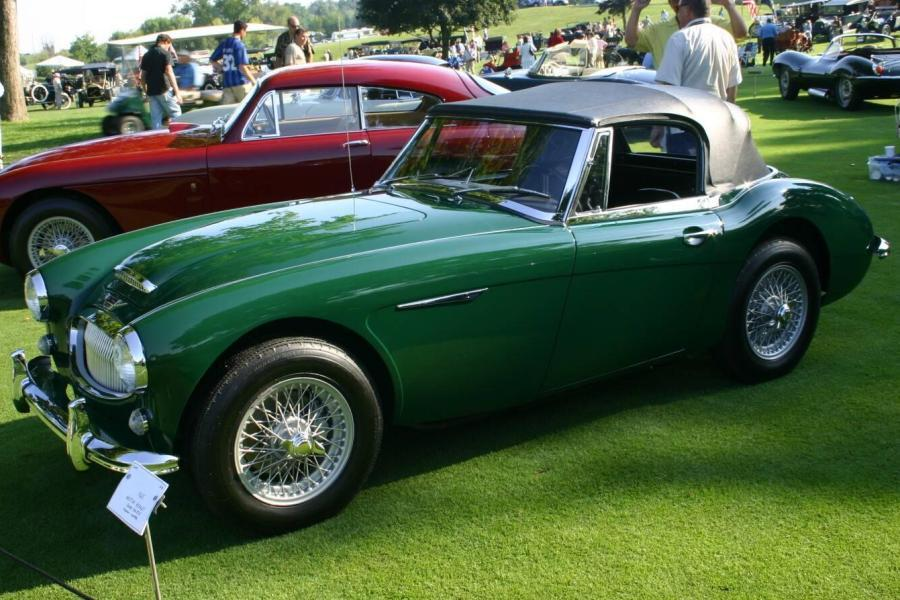
1965 Austin-Healey 3000 Mk III BJ8

Convertible 2+2-seater (wind-up windows)

- 1962–1963 BJ7 Mark II (2+2 convertible)
- 1963–1967 BJ8 Mark III (2+2 convertible)

=== Austin-Healey Sprite ===
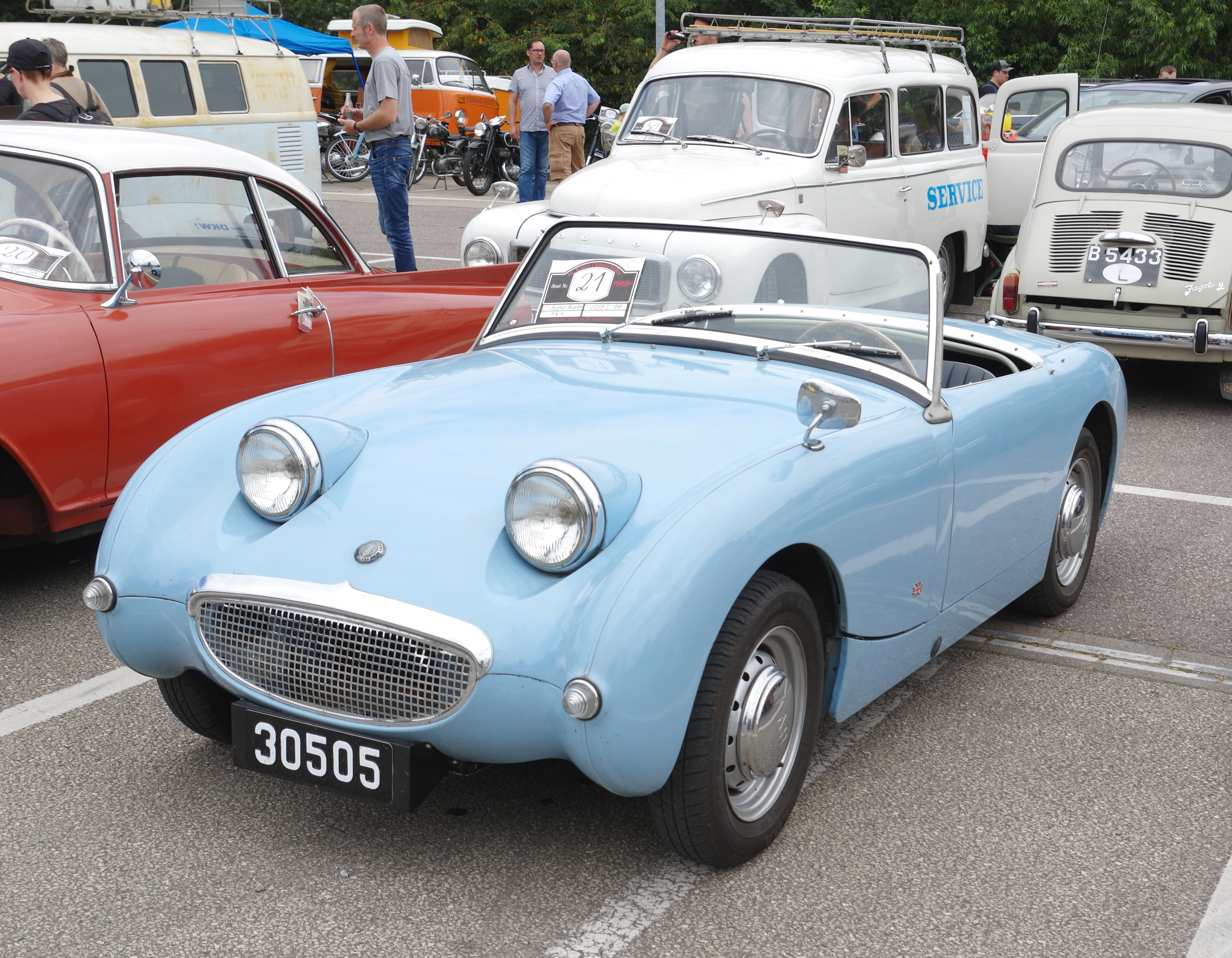
1960 Austin-Healey Sprite Mark I AN5

Open 2-seater

- 1958–1961 AN5 Mark I (UK: "Frogeye"; US: "Bugeye")
- 1961–1964 HAN6–HAN7 Mark II

2-seater Roadster

- 1964–1966 HAN8 Mark III (roll-up windows)
- 1966–1969 HAN9 Mark IV
- 1969–1970 HAN10 Mark IV (UK only)
- 1971 AAN10 Mark IV (UK only; badged as Austin rather than Austin-Healey)

=== Concept cars ===
- BMW Project Warwick (2001)
- Project Tempest (render only) (2005)
- Unnamed HFI Automotive Prototype (2006)

== Racing ==
The Austin Healey was extensively raced by the Donald Healey Motor Company in Europe at Le Mans and at Sebring in the U.S., in classic rallies by the BMC competitions department, and was recognised from the very beginning by the Sports Car Club of America (SCCA). Healey models raced in club racing in D, E, F, G, an H production classes, winning National Championships in all five classes. The last Big Healey to win an SCCA National Championship was the class E Production Austin-Healey 100-6 driven by Alan Barker at the Daytona ARRC in 1965.

In 1953, a special streamlined Austin-Healey set several land speed records at the Bonneville Salt Flats in Utah, USA.

== Attempts at revival ==
The rights to the Austin name later passed to British Aerospace and later BMW when each bought the Rover Group. In 2001, BMW revealed the “Project Warwick” concept, a retro-styled, modern interpretation of the Austin Healey built around the aluminium chassis from the BMW Z8. It is believed that Project Warwick advanced sufficiently enough to necessitate talks with the Healey family, although these talks ultimately broke down and the project was cancelled due to a lack of marque ownership rights. BMW later sold the Rover group to the Phoenix Consortium for a nominal £10, creating the MG Rover Group.

During the sale of the MG Rover group following its bankruptcy, Professor Krish Bhaskar, a bidder for the company, revealed the Austin Healey 3000 inspired “Project Tempest” in 2005. Bhaskar stated that the car would use running gear from the MG XPower SV covered with a lightweight aluminium body. Bhaskar’s bid failed however, and the project never came to fruition.

The Austin name was subsequently owned by China's Nanjing Automobile Group, which bought the assets of MG Rover Group out of bankruptcy in 2005. Nanjing signed a collaborative agreement with GB Sports Car, a company founded by former Rover officials, aiming to bring back production at the Longbridge plant under the MG, Rover and Austin-Healey marques, with the MG XPower SV being rebadged as an Austin-Healey. The idea to produce Austin-Healey branded cars was later dropped and the deal subsequently stalled.

After Donald Healey sold his original Donald Healey Motor Company, the Healey brand was registered to a new firm, Healey Automobile Consultants; the Healey family sold this successor company to British-American consortium HFI Automotive in 2005. In February 2006, HFI Automotive announced plans for a sports car “with the DNA of a Healey 3000” in coupe and convertible versions, as well as a cheaper car likened to an Austin Healey Sprite. HFI announced that deposits of £1000 were being taken, and prototypes were to be shown later that year. No prototypes were shown, but it was reported that HFI developed and tested a running prototype.

In June 2007, Nanjing and Healey Automobile Consultants / HFI Automotive signed a collaborative agreement aiming to recreate the Austin Healey and Healey marques alongside NAC's MG. No timeline was given for the Healey and Austin-Healey brands to return, although production of the MG TF restarted in August that year, and the first all-new MG-branded model in 16 years, the MG6, was launched 4 years later in 2011.

The Nanjing Automobile Group later merged with the much larger SAIC Motor, transferring many former British assets including the Austin marque to SAIC.

In 2015, British company Healy Designs revealed the 'Enigma', a Mazda MX-5 based modern interpretation of a Big Healey. The kit car features a retro style fibreglass body atop an MX-5 chassis, with either a 2.0 litre Mazda engine or a larger V8 from a Lexus or Corvette.

== See also ==
- Donald Healey Motor Company for the models made by the independent Healey company.
- Nash-Healey for a Nash-engined pre-Austin sports car by Donald Healey.
- Jensen-Healey for a later Donald Healey designed sports car.
- List of car manufacturers of the United Kingdom
