= Austin-Healey 100 =

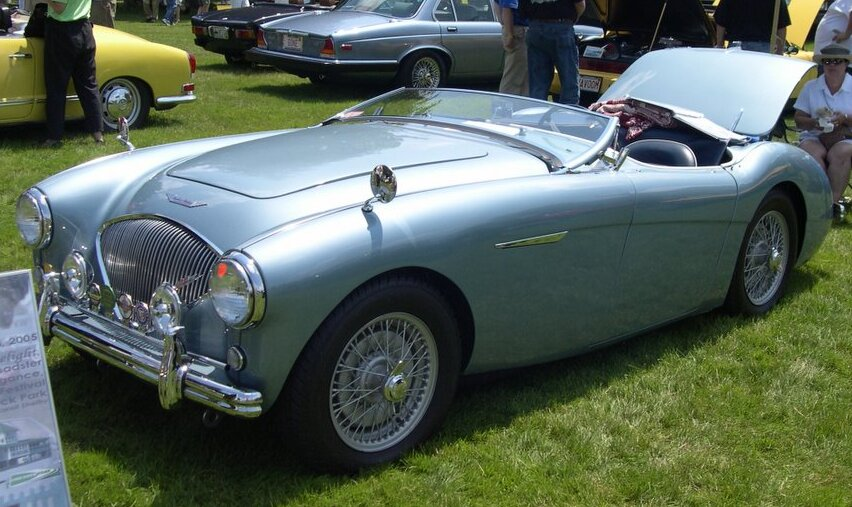
- 1956 Austin-Healey 100

Overview
- Manufacturer: Austin-Healey (BMC)
- Production: 1953–1956
- Assembly: United Kingdom: Longbridge, England (Longbridge plant); United Kingdom: West Bromwich, England

Powertrain
- Engine: 2660 cc I4
- Transmission: 3-speed (series BN1) or 4-speed (series BN2) manual

Dimensions
- Wheelbase: 90 in (2,286 mm)
- Length: 151 in (3,835 mm)
- Width: 60 in (1,524 mm)
- Height: 49.25 in (1,251 mm)

Chronology
- Successor: Austin-Healey 100-6

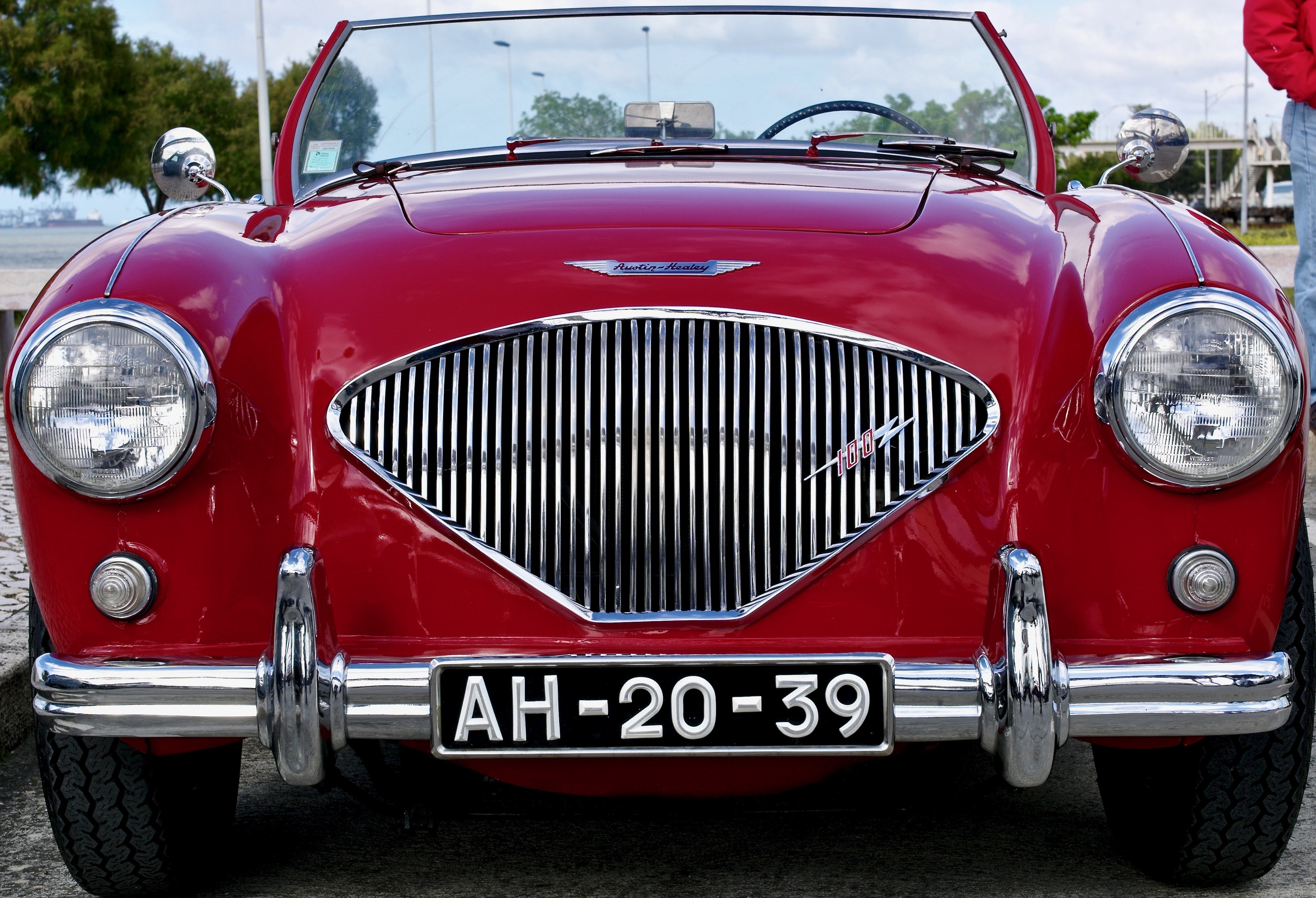
1956 Austin-Healey 100

The Austin-Healey 100 is a sports car that was assembled by Austin from 1953 until 1956.

Based on Austin A90 Atlantic mechanicals, it was developed by Donald Healey from his Nash-Healey 2 door sports car, which had Nash mechanicals instead, to be produced in-house by his small Healey car company in Warwick. Healey had Tickford build a single Healey Hundred for the 1952 London Motor Show, and the design impressed Leonard Lord, managing director of Austin, who was looking for a replacement for the unsuccessful A90. Body styling was by Gerry Coker, the chassis was designed by Barry Bilbie with longitudinal members and cross bracing producing a comparatively stiff structure upon which to mount the body, innovatively welding the front bulkhead to the frame for additional strength. In order to keep the overall vehicle height low the rear axle was underslung, the chassis frame passing under the rear axle assembly.

Lord struck a deal with Healey to build it in quantity; bodies made by Jensen Motors were given Austin mechanical components at Austin's Longbridge plant. The car was renamed the Austin-Healey 100.

The "100" was named by Healey for the car's ability to reach 100 mph (161 km/h); its successor, the better known Austin-Healey 3000, was named for the almost 3000 cc displacement of its engine.

Apart from the first twenty cars, production Austin-Healey 100s were finished at Austin's Longbridge plant alongside the A90 and based on fully trimmed and painted body/chassis units produced by Jensen in West Bromwich—in an arrangement the two companies previously had explored with the Austin A40 Sports. 14,634 Austin-Healey 100s were produced.

The 100 was the first of three models later called the Big Healeys to distinguish them from the much smaller Austin-Healey Sprite. The Big Healeys are often referred to by their three-character model designators rather than by their models, as the model names do not reflect the mechanical differences and similarities well.

== BN1 ==
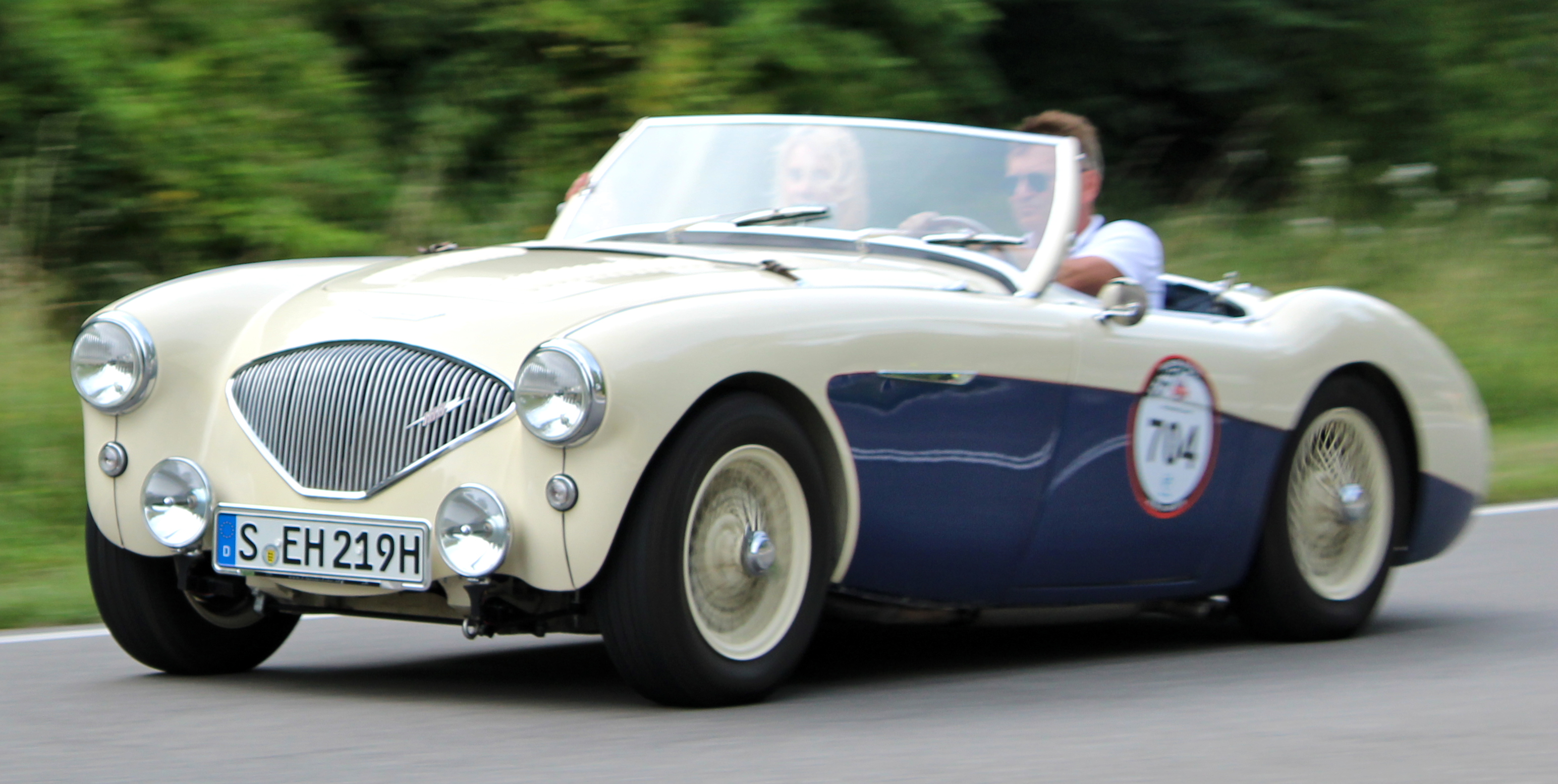
Austin Healey 100 BN1

The first 100s (series "BN1") were equipped with the same undersquare 87.3 mm (3.4 in) bore and 111.1 mm (4.4 in) stroke 90 bhp (67 kW) 2660 cc I4 engines and manual transmission as the standard production A90, but the transmission was modified to be a three-speed floor-shift unit with a switched overdrive on second and top. First gear was blanked out on all transmissions intended for BN1s, as the original first gear was deemed too short to be practical combined with the car's 4.25:1 final drive and lower weight compared to the A90. Overdrive was then added to provide the BN1 with similar transmission functionality to a 4-speed car.

Girling 11 in (279.4 mm) drum brakes were fitted all round. The suspension used modified Austin A90 components in order to be as cost effective as possible, steering was by Austin's worm and peg system. Front suspension was independent, double wishbone using coil springs and at the rear a rigid axle with semi elliptic leaf springs.

A BN1 tested by The Motor magazine in 1953 had a top speed of 106 mph (171 km/h) and could accelerate from 0–60 mph (97 km/h) in 11.2 seconds. A fuel consumption of 22.5 miles per imperial gallon (12.6 L/100 km; 18.7 mpg_{‑US}) was recorded. The test car cost £1063 including taxes.

A total of 10030 BN1s were built from May 1953 until replaced by the BN2 model in August 1955. A 1954 BN1 (chassis #446766*4) is on permanent display in the Bonneville Salt Flats exhibit at the Simeone Foundation Automotive Museum in Philadelphia, PA, USA.

== BN2 ==
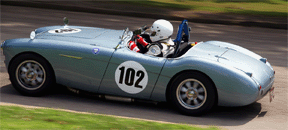
Austin Healey BN-2 – Vintage Racing

The BN2 was fitted with a real four-speed manual transmission, still with overdrive on the top two gears. Other features that distinguish the BN2 from the BN1 are the slightly larger front wheel arches, different rear axle and being the first 100 with optional two-tone paint.

The BN2 was available initially in Carmine Red which was replaced with Reno Red, Spruce Green, Healey Blue, Florida Green, Old English White, Black, and approximately 50 Gunmetal Grey cars. Two-tone options were: White/Black; Reno Red/Black; Healey Blue/White; Black/Reno Red; and Florida Green/White

By January 1956 production was running at 200 cars each month and sales in California 150 cars each month.

The final BN2 was built in July 1956, with a total of 4604 BN2s produced, including the 100M. Many BN-2 and 100-M Austin Healeys compete in vintage events like the Pittsburgh Vintage Gran Prix.

=== 100M ===
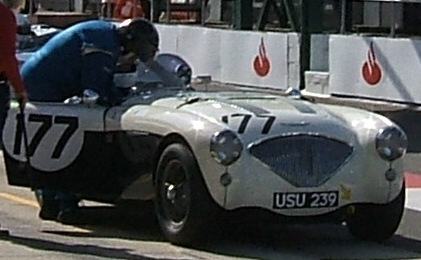
Austin-Healey 100M

A high-performance 100M model was introduced in 1955 with larger carburettors, a cold air box to increase engine air flow, high-lift camshaft and 8.1:1 compression pistons. It produced 110 bhp (82 kW) at 4500 rpm. The front suspension was stiffened and the bonnet gained louvres, along with a bonnet belt. Approximately 70% of 100Ms were finished with a two-tone paint scheme, including one White over Red and another in Black over Pink for display at the 1955 London Motor Show. In all, 640 100Ms were built by the factory.

The 100M components (including the high compression pistons) were also available as the Le Mans Engine Modification Kit, which could be installed in either a BN1 or BN2 with the engine in situ, improving the power output to approximately 100 bhp (75 kW) at 4500 rpm. The kit could be ordered from BMC, allowing private owners to make their own modifications.

There are several categories of cars to distinguish between the factory produced cars and others: (a) The early 100's retrofitted with the "Le Mans" kit, either by Donald Healey, an Austin Healey dealer, or owners; (b) The 640 factory-built "Le Mans" cars which were named 100 M; and (c) Cars that have been converted to "Le Mans" specifications in more recent years. Only the factory-registered chassis identification numbers distinguish the actual factory built originals from others.

== 100S ==
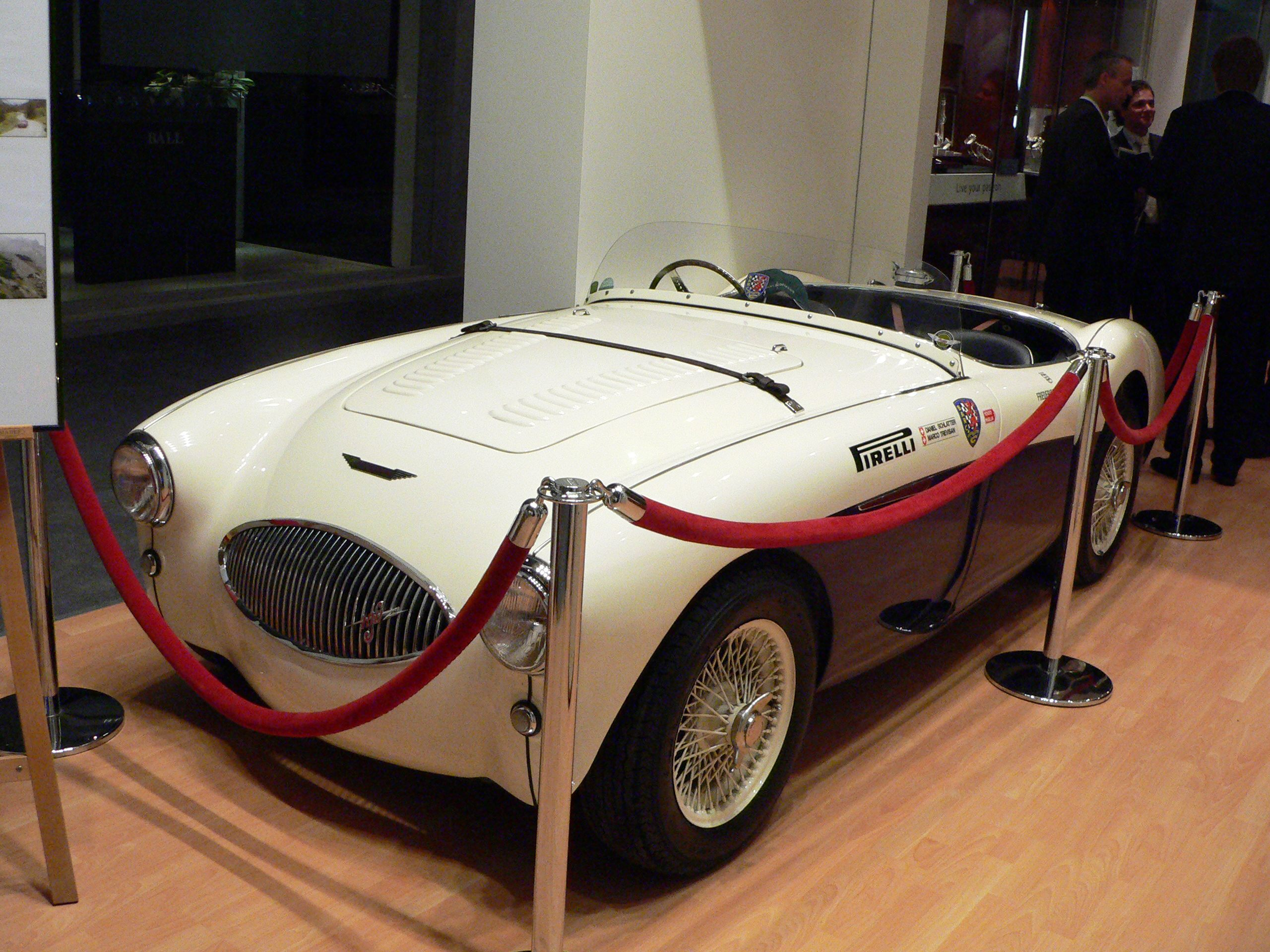
Austin-Healey 100S

Built primarily for racing, the aluminium-bodied "100S" (for Sebring) model developed 132 bhp (98 kW) at 4700 rpm. Five works development/special test cars carrying the "SPL" chassis number prefix were developed during 1953 and 1954, with one winning its class at Sebring in 1954 and prompting the "S" designation. Only 50 production 100S cars were made, hand built by the Donald Healey Motor Company at Warwick, delivered between February and November 1955 and carrying the "AHS" chassis number prefix. To minimize weight and improve performance the cast iron cylinder head was replaced by a Weslake designed aluminium one, and the overdrive unit was not installed. Dunlop disc brakes were used all-round, the world's first production car to feature them both front and rear. To further lighten the vehicle, bumpers and hood (convertible top) were eliminated, the grille reduced in size, and the windscreen made of plastic. In all, weight was reduced by approximately 200 lb (91 kg). The majority of 100Ss were two-toned white with Lobelia Blue sides. A handful were produced in solid Spruce Green and red, and a single one in black.

An unrestored works racing team 1953 Austin-Healey '100S' Special Test Car that had been campaigned by factory drivers Lance Macklin, Gordon Wilkins and Marcel Becquart, sold for a world record £843,000 ($1,323,915) 1 December 2011, at Bonhams' December Sale. This car was involved in the 1955 Le Mans disaster, motor racing's most lethal crash—in which 84 people died and 120 were injured.

Driver David Shale raced an Austin Healey 100S. It is known that Shale gained at least 13 podium finishes in the car, coming 1st in 4 of those races. "EVV", as the car is colloquially known, sold for £673,500 at the Bonhams Goodwood Festival of Speed auction on 27 June 2014.

== Healey 100 in vintage racing ==
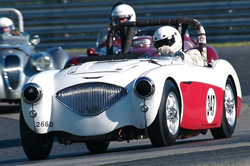
Austin Healey 100 racecar driven by Rich Maloumian

The Austin Healey 100 in BN1 and BN2 models, four cylinder format has done very well in vintage racing. The standard BN2 can produce 90bhp, and could exceed 100mph hence the "100", however in 100M spec, see above, the larger carburetors, high lift cam and slightly less dished pistons (higher compression) the car can produce up to 110bhp. Some simple modifications, lightening, by removal of the bumpers, interior trim and carpets, the 100 can be quite nimble on racing circuits around the world. Aluminum alloy wheels will accommodate wider and lower profile tyres that can lower the centre of gravity providing additional stability in corners. Alloy wheels become almost essential as the performance of the car increases and the old wire wheels especially the original 48 spoke wheels become a weak point in the structure. Fortunately there are several suppliers that provide "Mini-lite" and "Panasport" style wheels which are close to period correct.

Significantly modified four cylinder Healey 100s can provide exceptional performance, competing with six cylinder Aston Martins and even 12 cylinder Ferraris of the same era.

=== Model designators ===
See Austin-Healey#Models built for a more detailed listing

- 100: 2-seat
  - BN1: 3 speed +OD, 1952–55
  - BN2: 4 speed +OD, 1955–56
  - AHS: 1955
- 100/6
  - BN4: 2+2, 1956–59
  - BN6 2-seat. 1958–59
- 3000 Mk I
  - BN7 2-seat. 1959–61
  - BT7 2+2, 1959–61
- 3000 Mk II
  - BN7 2-seat, 1961–62
  - BT7 2+2, 1961–62
  - BJ7 2+2, 1962–63
- 3000 Mk III
  - BJ8 Phase 1 2+2, 1964
  - BJ8 Phase 2 2+2, 1964–68
