= Caversham Airfield =

WWII airfield in Caversham, Western Australia

- IATA: none; ICAO: none

Summary
- Location: Caversham, Western Australia
- Coordinates: 31°50′16″S 115°58′27″E

Map
- Location in Western Australia

Caversham Airfield, also known as Middle Swan Airfield, was an airfield constructed at Caversham, Western Australia during World War II as a parent aerodrome for use by the Royal Navy's Fleet Air Arm and the United States Navy.

The airfield had a triangle of three landing strips.

Middle Swan was the parent airfield with the following satellite airfields:

- Beverley
- Bindoon
- Gingin North (Note: The usage of Gin Gin – at the Western Australian location – is found in some documents, but general usage is a single word with no duplication Gingin, Western Australia, there is another location in Australia with the duplicated form – see Gin Gin, Queensland)
- Mooliabeenee

The United States Army Air Corps also utilised the airfield during World War II.

It was also a gliding club location after the war.

== Motor racing circuit ==
Caversham
- Location: Caversham, Western Australia
- Owner: Department of Defence
- Operator: Western Australia Sporting Car Club
- Opened: 1946
- Closed: 1968
- Major events: Australian Grand Prix; Australian Drivers' Champ. Six Hour Le Mans
- Length: 3.50 km (2.17 mi)
- Turns: 10

The airfield was later utilised as a motor racing circuit, hosting its first event in 1946. In 1956 the Western Australia Sporting Car Club gained a lease for the property, which was then converted into a permanent circuit. It became Western Australia's premier motor racing venue, hosting the Australian Grand Prix in 1957 and 1962 and the Six Hour Le Mans endurance race from 1955 to 1968. Racing activities ceased when the airfield was re-activated as a military facility for radio communications, and Western Australian racing shifted to Wanneroo Raceway in 1969.

== See also ==
- List of airports in Western Australia
- Aviation transport in Australia
