= Austin-Healey Sprite =

Overview
- Manufacturer: Austin-Healey (BMC, later British Leyland)
- Also called: Austin Sprite
- Production: 1958–1971
- Assembly: United Kingdom: Abingdon, England; Australia: Enfield, New South Wales

Body and chassis
- Class: Sports car
- Body style: 2-door roadster
- Layout: FR layout
- Related: MG Midget

The Austin-Healey Sprite is a small open sports car produced in the United Kingdom from 1958 to 1971. The Sprite was announced to the press in Monte Carlo by the British Motor Corporation on 20 May 1958, two days after that year's Monaco Grand Prix. It was intended to be a low-cost model that "a chap could keep in his bike shed", yet be the successor to the sporting versions of the pre-war Austin Seven. The Sprite was designed by the Donald Healey Motor Company, with production being undertaken at the MG factory at Abingdon. It first went on sale for £669, using a tuned version of the Austin A-Series engine and as many other components from existing cars as possible to keep costs down.

When the Mk. II Sprite was introduced in 1961 it was joined by a badge-engineered MG version, the Midget, reviving a model name used by MG from the late 1920s through to the mid-1950s. Enthusiasts often refer to these later Sprites and Midgets collectively as "Spridgets." The MG-badged version of the car continued in production for several years after the Austin-Healey brand ceased to exist.

== Mark I ==
Mark I
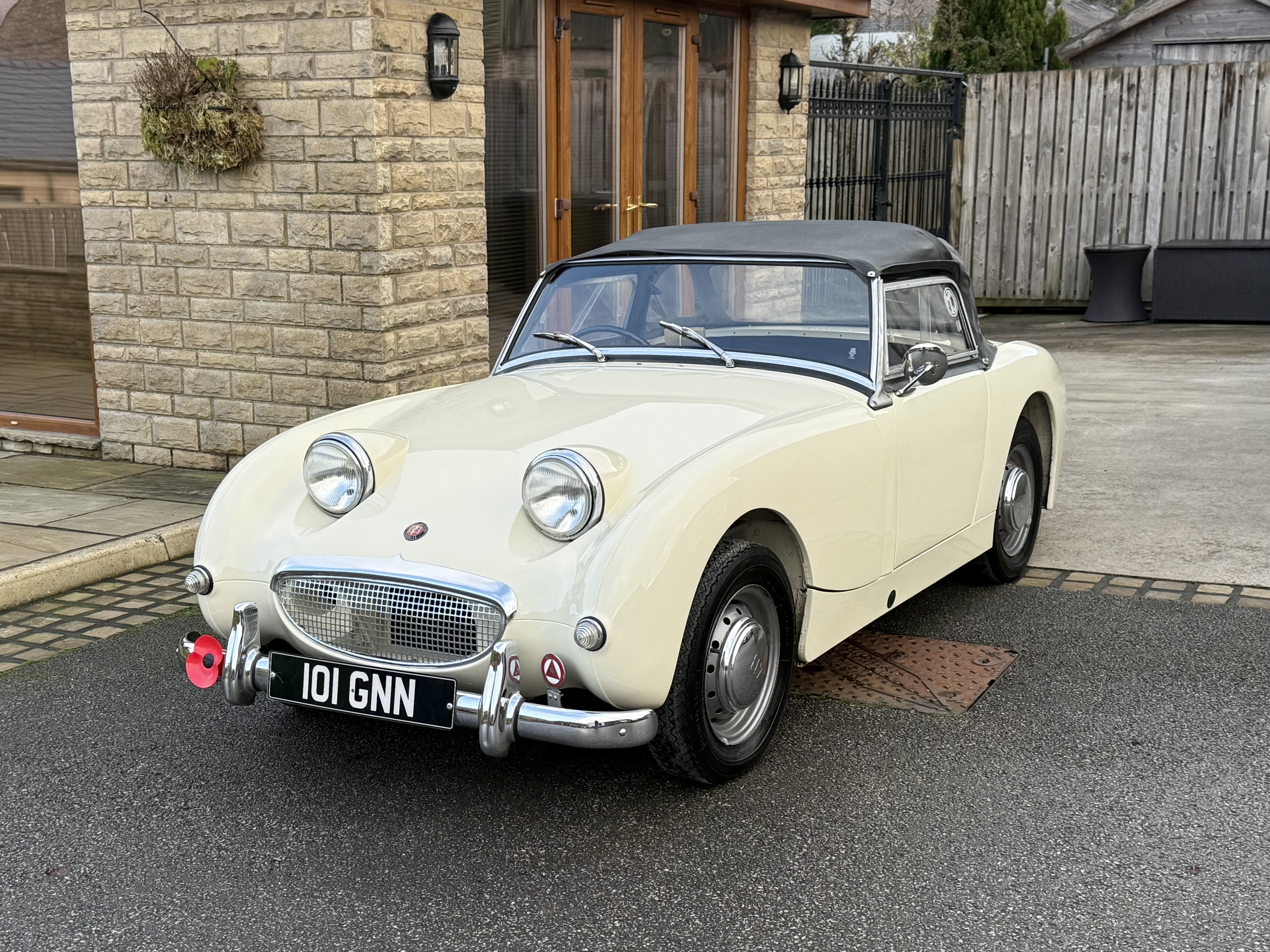

Overview
- Also called: Austin Sprite
- Production: 1958–1961
- Designer: Donald Healey

Powertrain
- Engine: 948 cc (0.9 L) A-Series I4 43HP

Dimensions
- Wheelbase: 2,032 mm (80.0 in)
- Length: 3,480 mm (137.0 in)
- Width: 1,346 mm (53.0 in)
- Height: 1,200 mm (47.2 in) (with bonnet up)

The Sprite quickly became affectionately known as the "frogeye" in the UK and the "bugeye" in the US, because its headlights were prominently mounted on top of the bonnet, inboard of the front wings. The car's designers had intended that the headlights could be retracted, with the lenses facing skyward when not in use; a similar arrangement was used many years later on the Porsche 928. However, cost-cutting by BMC led to the flip-up mechanism being deleted. Therefore, the headlights were simply fixed in a permanently upright position, giving the car its distinctive "cute" feature. The body was styled by Gerry Coker, with subsequent alterations by Les Ireland following Coker's emigration to the US in 1957. The car's distinctive frontal styling bore a strong resemblance to the defunct American 1951 Crosley Super Sport. A total of 48,987 "frogeye" Sprites were made.

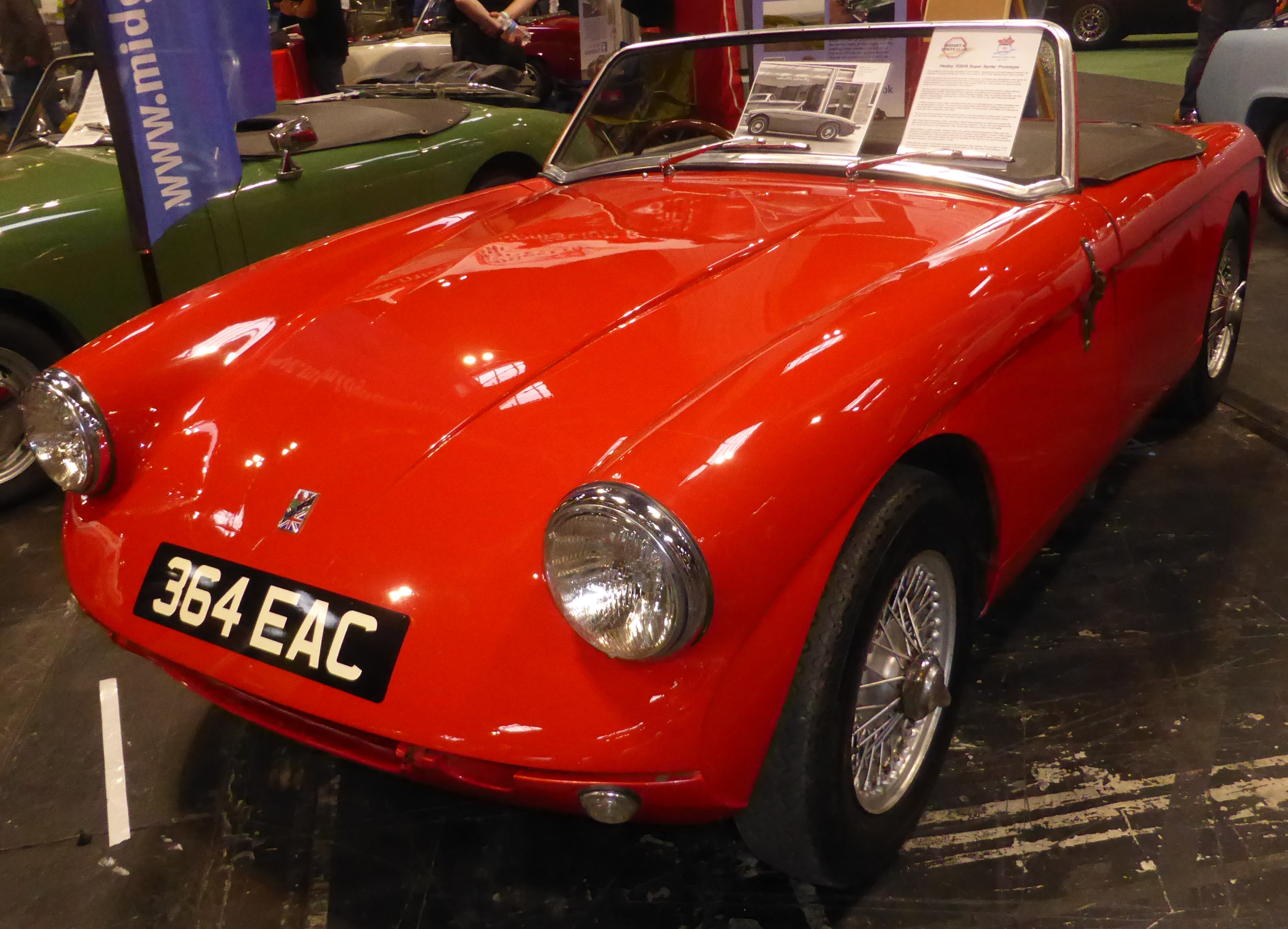
1958 XQHS Super Sprite Prototype by Donald Healey Motor Co.

The problem of providing a rigid structure to an open-topped sports car was resolved by Barry Bilbie, Healey's chassis designer, who adapted the idea provided by the Jaguar D-type, with rear suspension forces routed through the bodyshell's floor pan. The Sprite's chassis design was the world's first volume-production sports car to use unitary construction, where the sheet metal body panels (apart from the bonnet) take many of the structural stresses. The original metal gauge (thickness of steel) of the rear structure specified by Bilbie was reduced by the Austin Design Office during prototype build, however during testing at MIRA (Motor Industry Research Association) distortion and deformation of the rear structure occurred and the original specification was reinstated. The two front chassis legs projecting forward from the passenger compartment mean the shell is not a full monocoque. The front sheet-metal assembly, including the bonnet (hood) and wings, was a one-piece unit, hinged from the back, that swung up to allow access to the engine compartment.

The 43 bhp, 948 cc OHV engine (coded 9CC) was derived from the Austin A35 and Morris Minor 1000 models, also BMC products, but upgraded with twin 1 1/8 inch SU carburettors. The rack and pinion steering was derived from the Morris Minor 1000 and the front suspension from the Austin A35. The front suspension was a coil spring and wishbone arrangement, with the arm of the Armstrong lever shock absorber serving as the top suspension link. The rear axle was both located and sprung by quarter-elliptic leaf springs, again with lever-arm shock absorbers and top links. The road wheels were 13" and all cars were invariably fitted with Dunlop crossply tyres, usually their Gold Seal model in the 5.20x13 size, although later frogeyes shipped to North America wore 5.60x13 Dunlop crossplies. There were no exterior door handles – the driver and passenger were required to reach inside to open the door. There was also no boot lid, owing to the need to retain as much structural integrity as possible, and access to the spare wheel and luggage compartment was achieved by tilting the seat-backs forward and reaching under the rear deck, a process likened to potholing by many owners, as the space available was dark but cavernous.

Engine:

- 1958–1961: 948 cc A-Series I4, 43 hp (32 kW) at 5200 rpm and 52 lbf·ft (71 Nm) at 3300 rpm

A car was tested by the British magazine The Motor in 1958. It had a top speed of 82.9 mph (133.4 km/h) and could accelerate from 0–60 mph (97 km/h) in 20.5 seconds. Fuel consumption of 43 miles per imperial gallon (6.6 L/100 km; 36 mpg_{‑US}) was recorded. The test car cost £678, including taxes of £223.

The BMC Competitions Department entered Austin Healey Sprites in major international races and rallies, their first major success coming when John Sprinzel and Willy Cave won their class on the 1958 Alpine Rally. In 1959, the Sprite was introduced to the US market by winning its class in the 12-hour race at Sebring, Florida. Private competitors also competed with much success in Sprites. Because of its affordability and practicality, the Austin-Healey Sprite was developed into a formidable competition car, assuming many variants by John Sprinzel, Speedwell and WSM. Many owners use their Austin Healey Sprites in competition today, almost seventy years after its introduction.

Austin-Healey Sprite Mk I Gallery

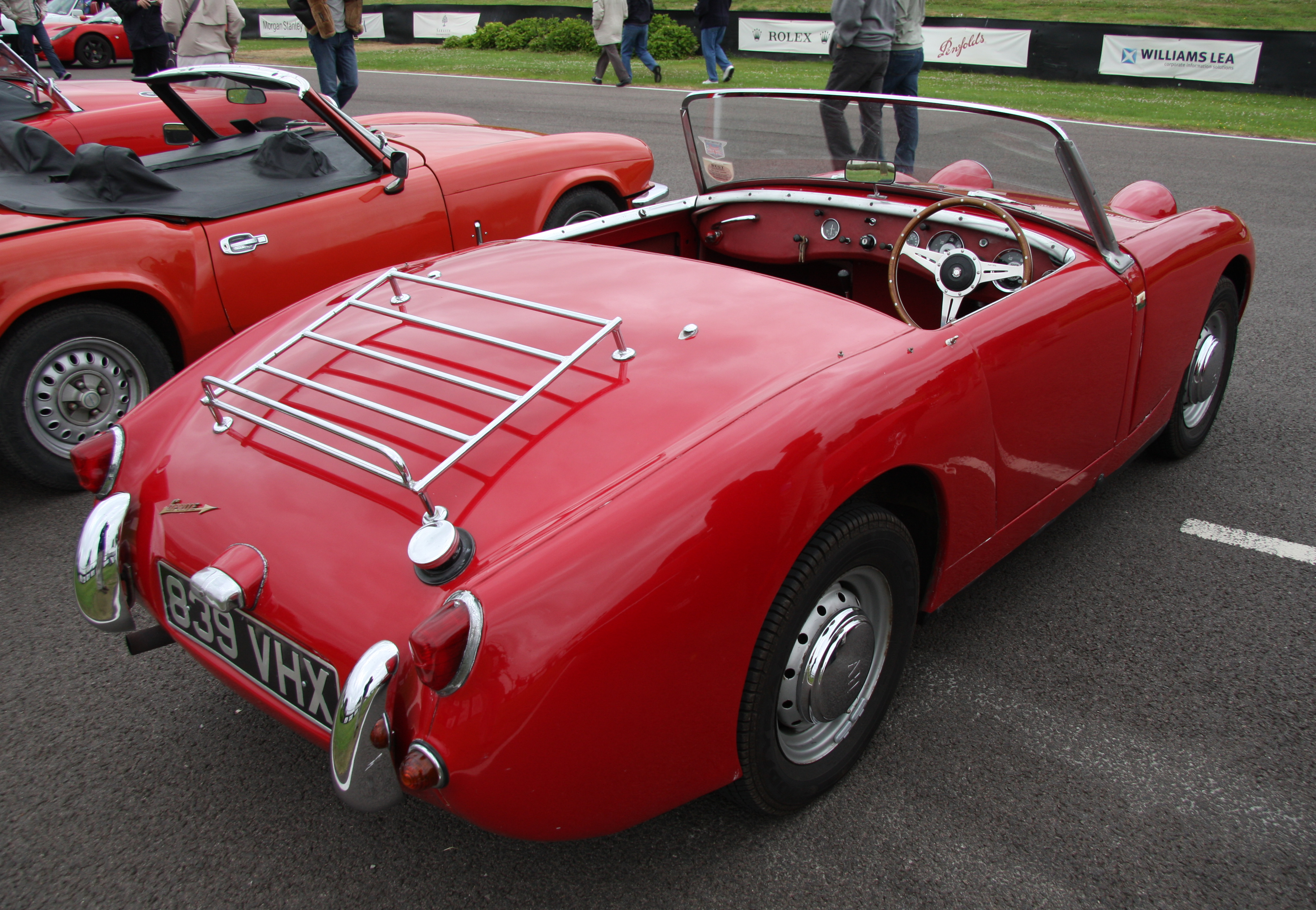

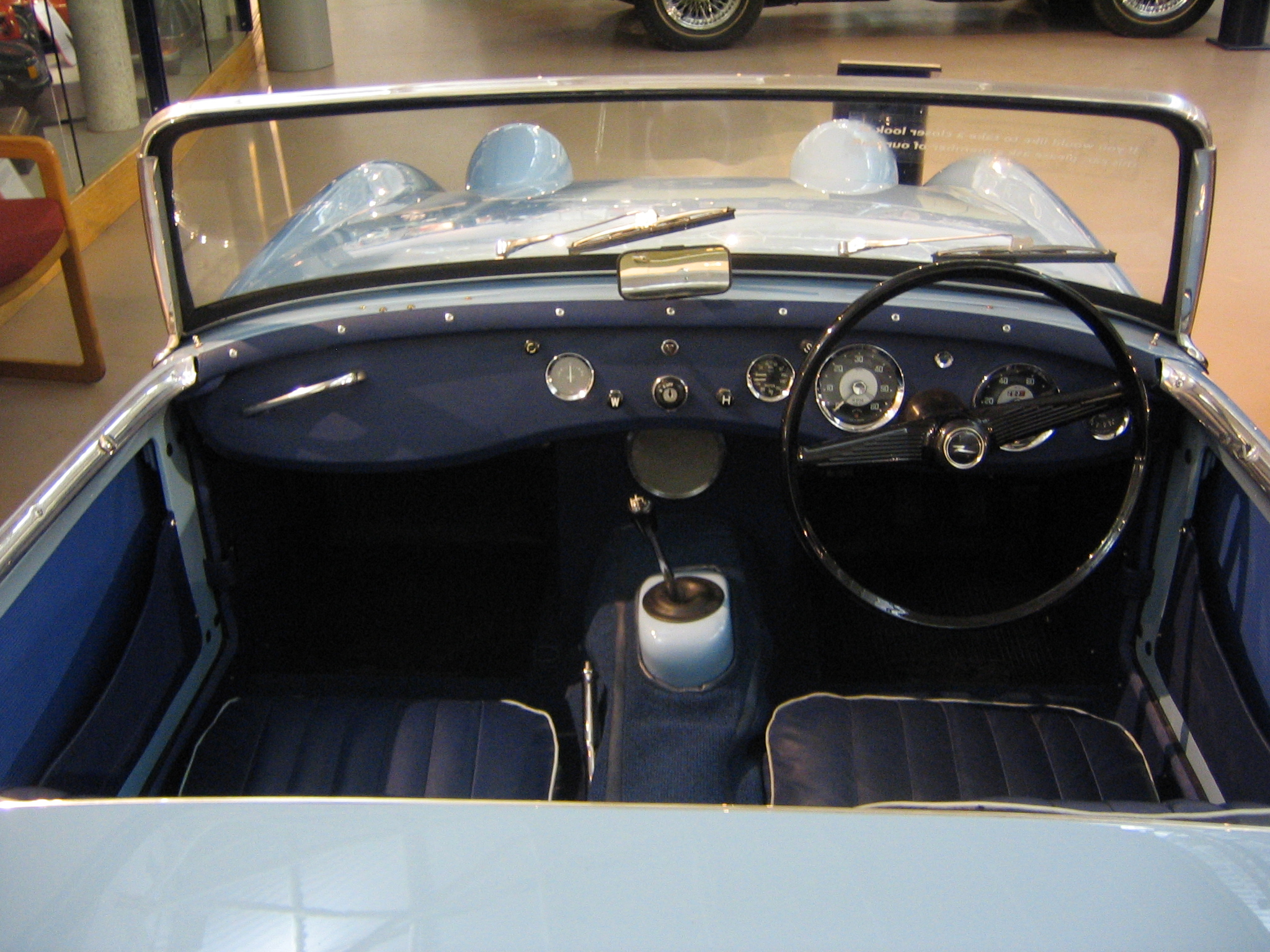

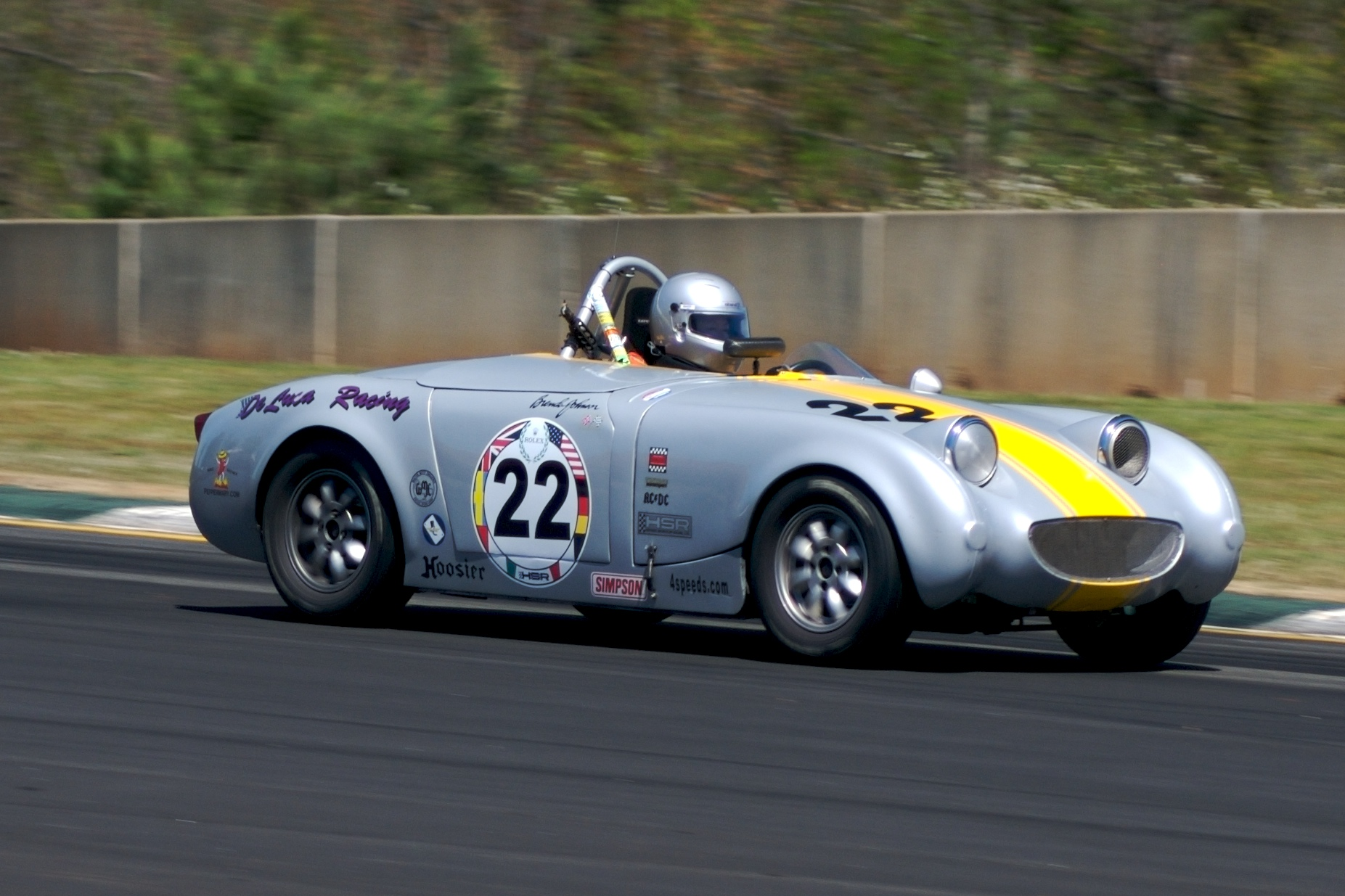

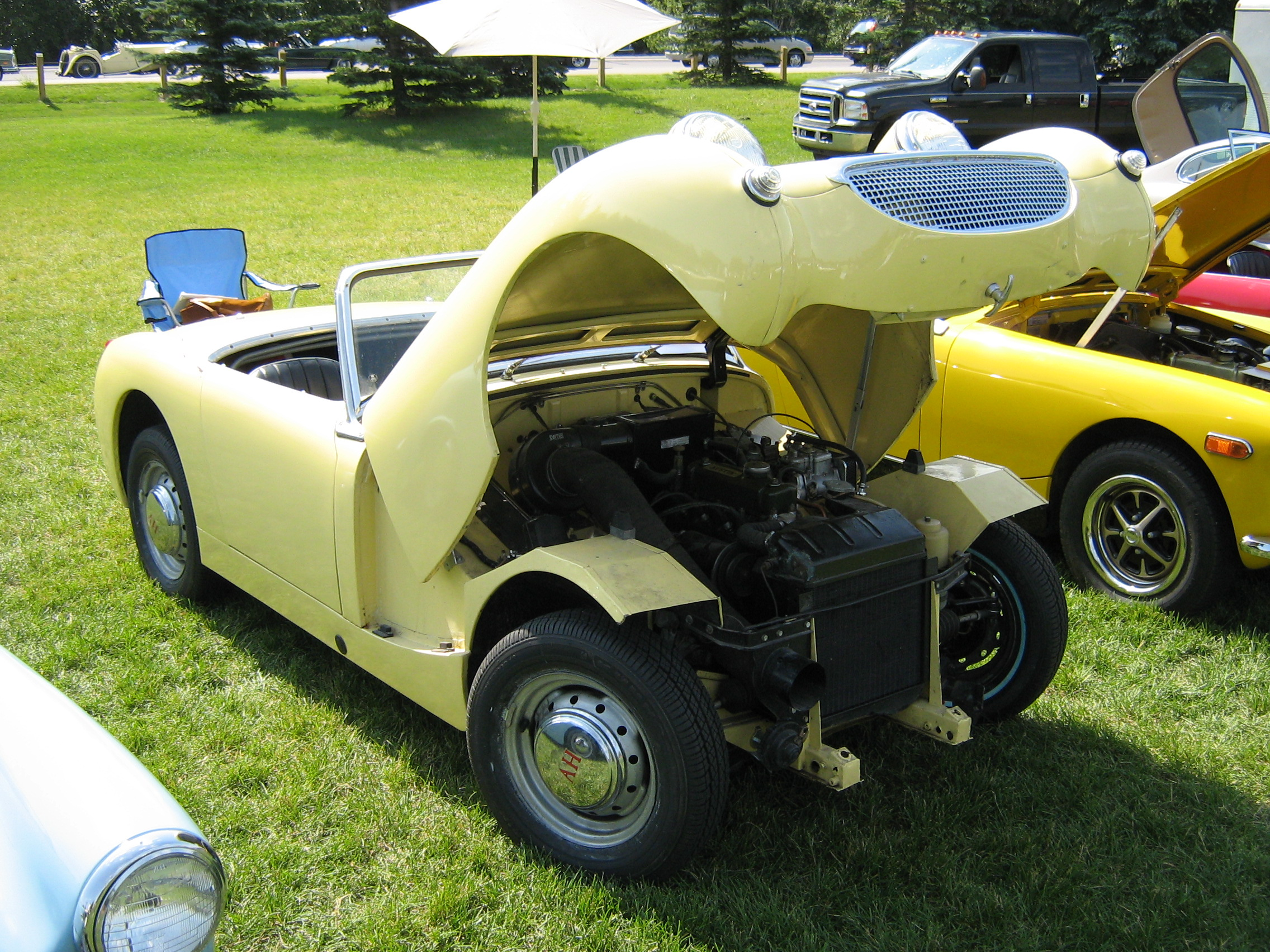

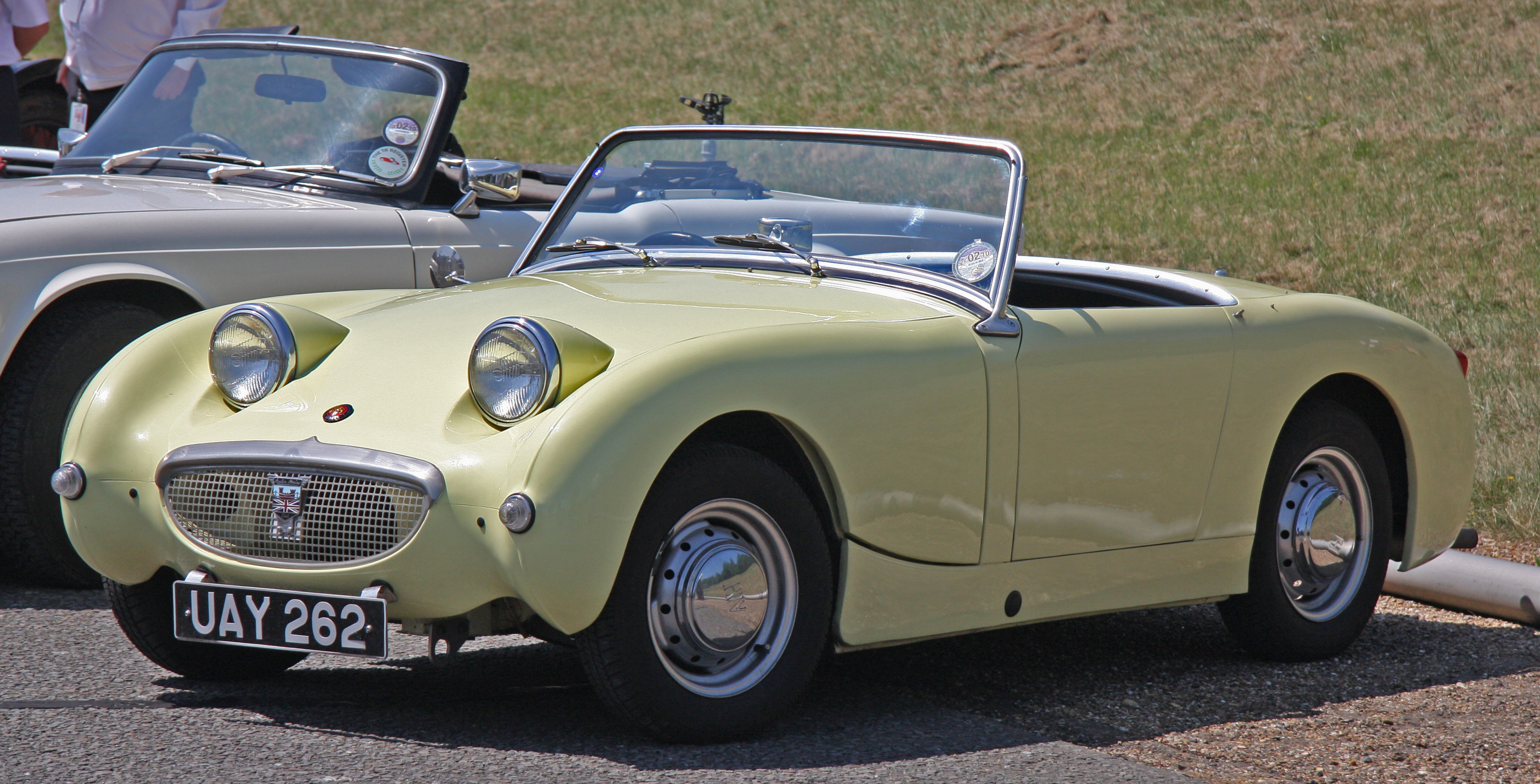

== Mark II ==
Mark II
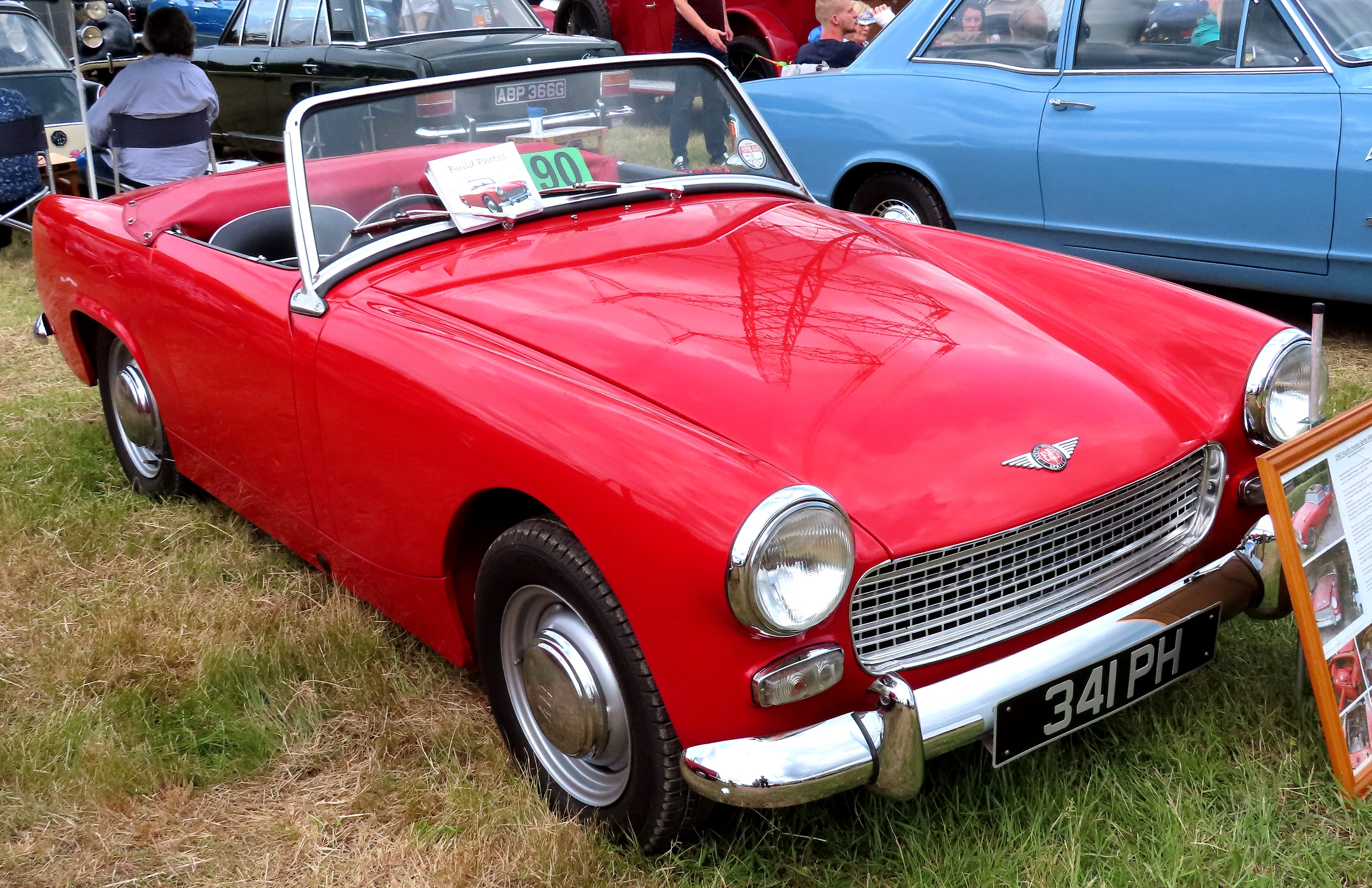
- Austin-Healey Sprite Mark II

Overview
- Production: 1961–1964

Body and chassis
- Related: MG Midget MkI

Powertrain
- Engine: 948 cc (0.9 L) later 1,098 cc (1.1 L) A-Series I4

Dimensions
- Wheelbase: 2,032 mm (80.0 in)
- Length: 3,305 mm (130.1 in)
- Width: 1,346 mm (53.0 in)
- Height: 48.25 in (1,226 mm) (with roof up)

The Mark II announced at the end of May 1961 used the same 948 cc engine (engine code 9CG), but with larger twin 1 1/4 inch SU carburettors, increasing power to 46.5 bhp. A close-ratio gearbox was fitted. The bodywork was completely revamped, with the headlights migrating to a more conventional position in the wings, either side of a full-width grille and a conventional bonnet. At the rear, styling borrowed from the soon-to-be-announced MGB gave a similarly more modern look, with the added advantages of an opening boot lid and conventional rear bumper bar. The addition of the boot lid required the introduction of squared-off rear wheel arches to retain enough metal in the rear structure to give good rigidity. The result was a much less eccentric-looking sports car, though at the expense of some 100 lbs extra weight. In contrast to the 'frogeye', the later cars are often collectively referred to as square-bodied Sprites by enthusiasts.

An MG version of the car was introduced in May 1961 as 'the new Midget,' reviving a model name which had been a great success for the MG Car Company in the 1930s and again as the T-type Midget in the period from 1945 to 1955. The Midget was to prove more popular with the public than the Sprite and by 1972 had completely supplanted it within the BMC range. In October 1962, both Sprites and Midgets were given a long-stroke 1098 cc engine (engine code 10CG), which was also fitted in single carburettor form to the Austin A40 and Morris Minor 1000 (which nevertheless remained the Minor 1000). A strengthened gearbox with Porsche (baulk-ring) synchromesh was introduced to cope with the extra power – 56 bhp. Front disc brakes were also introduced at the same time and wire wheels became an option. 31,665 Mark II Sprites were made.

Innocenti also produced their own version of the Sprite, using the standard production underframe (initially shipped out from England), but with Italian styling by the American Tom Tjaarda, then working at Carrozzeria Ghia. The Innocenti 950 spider and later 1100 spider were produced from 1961 until 1968.

A car with hardtop tested by the British magazine The Motor in 1961 had a top speed of 85.8 mph (138.1 km/h) and could accelerate from 0–60 mph (97 km/h) in 20.0 seconds. A fuel consumption of 43.5 miles per imperial gallon (6.49 L/100 km; 36.2 mpg_{‑US}) was recorded. The test car, which was to de-luxe specification cost £705 including taxes of £208.

Engines:

- 1961–1964: 948 cc A-Series I4, 46 hp (34 kW) at 5500 rpm and 53 lbf·ft (72 Nm) at 3000 rpm
- 1962–1964: 1098 cc A-Series I4, 56 hp (42 kW) at 5500 rpm and 62 lbf·ft (84 Nm) at 3250 rpm

== Mark III ==
Mark III
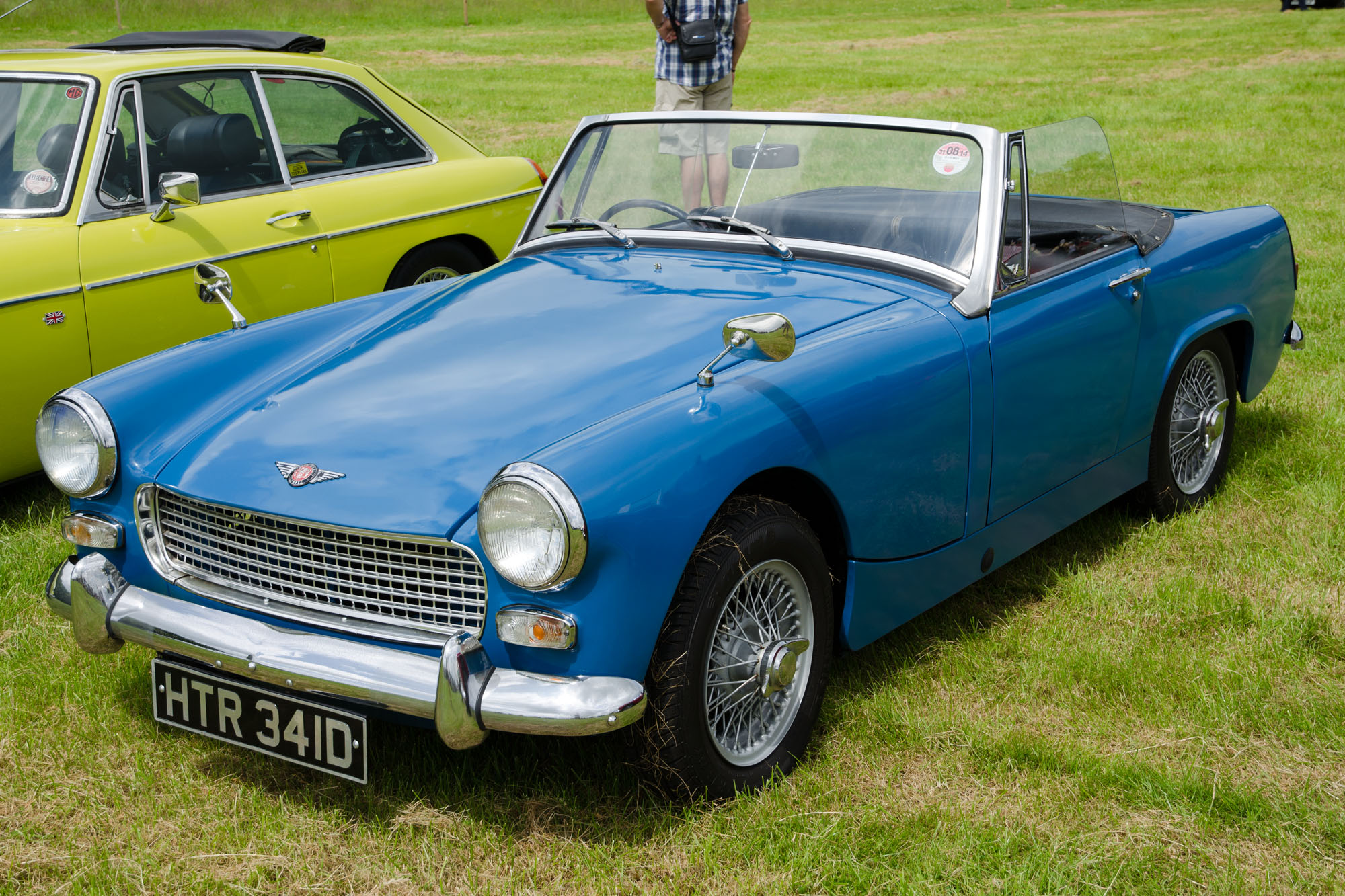

Overview
- Production: 1964–1966

Body and chassis
- Related: MG Midget MkII

Powertrain
- Engine: 1,098 cc (1.1 L) A-Series I4

Dimensions
- Wheelbase: 2,032 mm (80.0 in)
- Length: 3,461 mm (136.3 in)
- Width: 1,397 mm (55.0 in)

The Sprite Mark III was announced in March 1964. It was also marketed as the MG Midget Mark II. Differences between the two were again restricted to minor trim detailing. Although still 1098 cc, the engine had a stronger block casting, and the size of the crankshaft main bearings was increased to two inches (engine code 10CC).

A new (slightly) curved-glass windscreen was introduced with hinged quarterlights and wind-up side windows. Exterior door handles were provided for the first time, with separate door locks. Though the car could now be secured, with a soft-top roof the added protection was limited. The rear suspension was modified from quarter-elliptic to semi-elliptic leaf springs, which gave a more comfortable ride for a near-negligible weight penalty as well as providing additional axle location, the upper links fitted to the quarter-elliptic models being deleted. Though scarcely sybaritic, these changes helped the Sprite and Midget compete with the recently released Triumph Spitfire. 25,905 Mark III Sprites were made.

Engine:

- 1964–66: 1098 cc A-Series I4, 59 hp (44 kW) at 5750 rpm and 65 lbf·ft (88 Nm) at 3500 rpm

== Mark IV and Austin Sprite ==
Mark IV
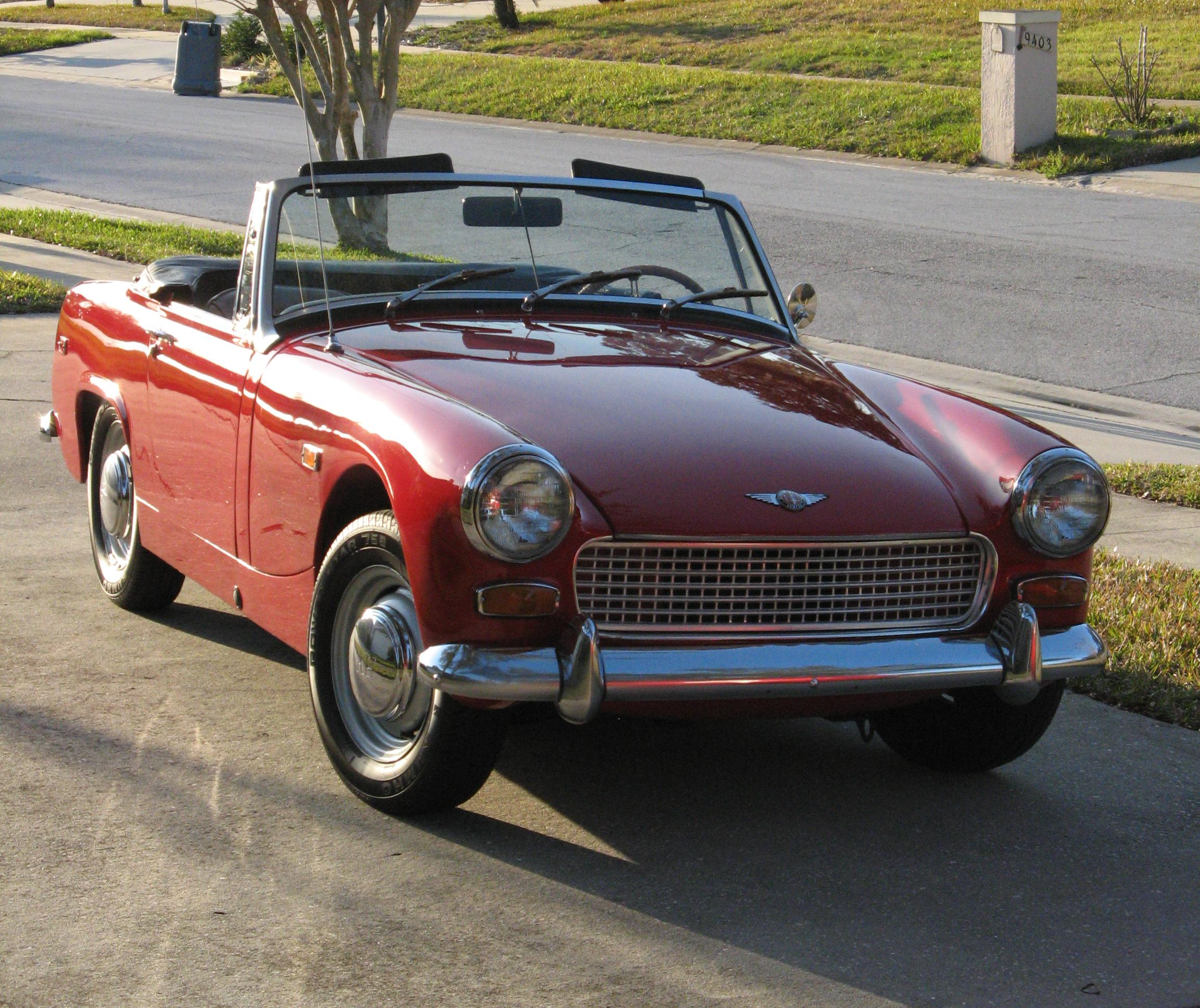

Overview
- Also called: Austin Sprite
- Production: 1966–1971

Body and chassis
- Related: MG Midget MkIII

Powertrain
- Engine: 1,275 cc (1.3 L) A-Series I4

Dimensions
- Wheelbase: 2,032 mm (80.0 in)
- Length: 3,492 mm (137.5 in)
- Width: 1,397 mm (55.0 in)

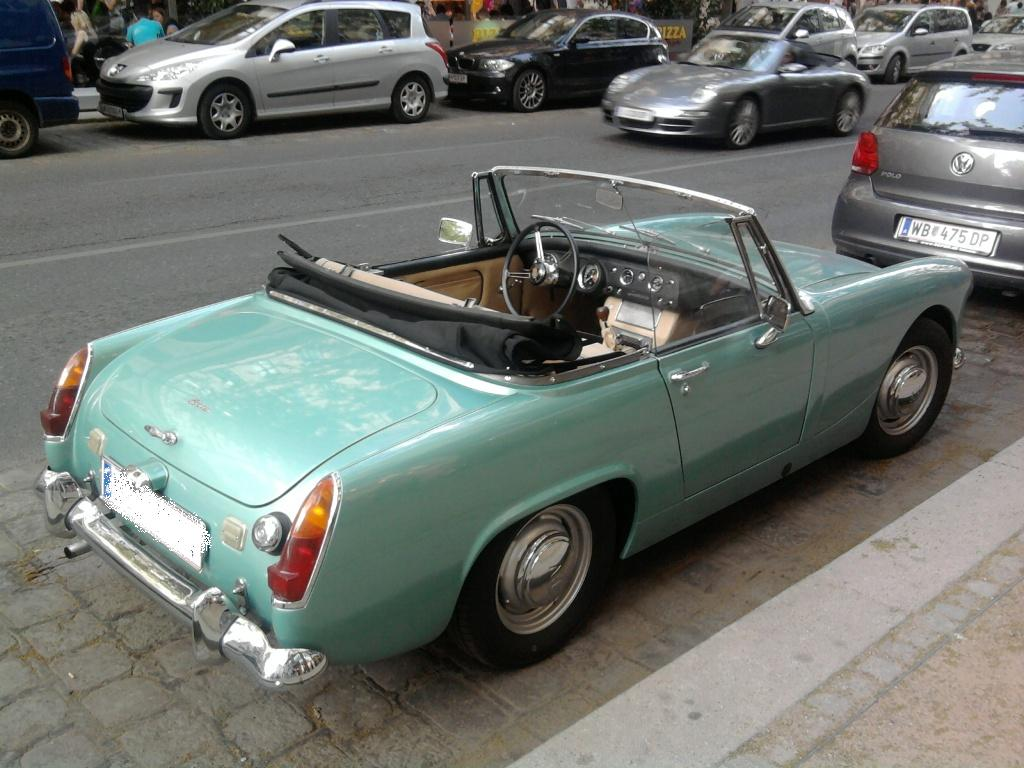
Austin-Healey Sprite Mark IV (EU)

The next upgrade was presented at the London Motor Show in October 1966. Besides receiving the larger 1275 cc engine (which disappointed enthusiasts by being in a lower state of tune than that of the Mini-Cooper 'S'), the Mark IV and its cousin the Mark III MG Midget had several changes which were more than cosmetic. Most notable is the change from a removable convertible top, which had to be stowed in the boot, to a permanently affixed, folding top of greatly improved design, which was much easier to use. Separate brake and clutch master cylinders were fitted, as car manufacturers' thoughts began to turn to making their products safer. On US market versions the larger engine sacrificed some of its performance from 1968 on, through the use of smog pumps and other modifications to comply with federal emission control requirements. 1969 was the final year the Sprite was exported to the US. At the same time reversing lamps were made a standard fitment and the cars' electrical system was switched to negative earth and powered by an alternator rather than a dynamo. This was also the first year that reclining seats were fitted.

A facelift was carried out for the 1970 model year (beginning in September 1969) after Austin-Healey (and MG) became part of British Leyland. These largely cosmetic revision were to update the appearance of the car (now 10 years old) and minimise the difference between the Sprite and Midget versions to reduce production costs; both cars now had the same cosmetic features, differing only in their badges. Alongside a new range of body colours, both cars now had the same grille, based on the plainer square-mesh design of the MkII-onwards Sprite but now finished in satin black with the addition of a chrome embellisher. The body sills were painted satin black with a chrome strip between them and the upper bodywork and the name "SPRITE" was applied in chrome capital letters on the sill just behind the front wheelarch (MG Midgets had their own badge in the same style).

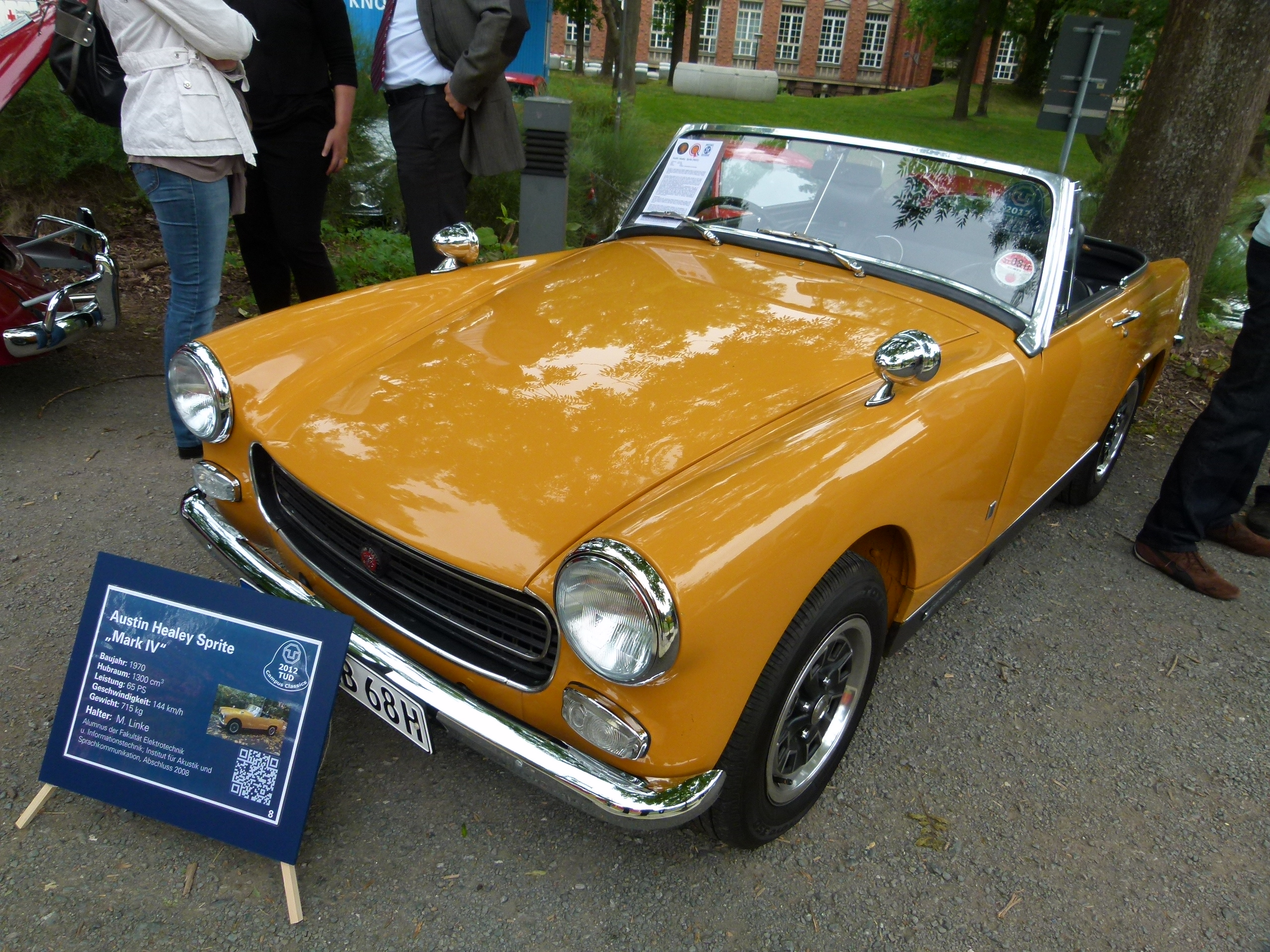
1970 Austin-Healey Sprite Mark IV with revised grille and steel wheels with cast-alloy appearance

Slimmer bumpers were fitted, with those at the rear changing to two quarter-bumpers with the gap in the middle filled by a square number plate. Rubber-capped overriders were standard fitment front and rear. The seats were now a slimmer, flatter design with a more modern upholstery pattern. Some body colours could now be ordered with the option of the seats, door trim and floor carpets in beige rather than the standard black. 1970-model year Sprites were fitted with new cast-alloy looking ventilated wheels although they were still made of steel although the option for wire-spoke wheels remained. As launched the 1970 Sprites had their windscreen frames and windscreen wiper arms painted 'anti-dazzle' matt black as was popular on modern American muscle cars and rally cars of the era but these features were expensive to produce and unpopular with buyers so only around 20 cars were produced before these reverted to the original polished metal appearance. 22,790 Mark IV Sprites were made.

Engine:

- 1966–1971: 1275 cc A-Series I4, 65 hp (48 kW) at 6000 rpm and 72 lbf·ft (98 Nm) at 3000 rpm

The Healey connection was discontinued in 1971, so the final 1,022 Sprites built were simply Austin Sprites. This was a cost-cutting move of Donald Stokes', enabling British Leyland to stop paying royalties to the Donald Healey Motor Company. There was no direct successor, as BL's extensive range already contained the MG Midget, which was identical to the Sprite except for badging, and the similarly dimensioned and priced Triumph Spitfire.

== Competition ==
The Sprite (and its MG Midget sibling) have been successful club level race cars since their launch and continue to race in various events to the present day. International events were entered throughout the 1960s and surprisingly good results were achieved, including a 12th-place finish at Le Mans in 1965. The works cars began with use of a commercially available fibreglass-bodied Sprite (with a Falcon body) before utilising lightweight body panels of standard appearance. By the mid-60s, use was made of the wind-tunnel at Longbridge. Barry Bilbie (the chassis designer) utilised the results to produce a streamlined body, built in Birmabright alloy at Healey's Warwick workshops by Bill Buckingham and Terry Westwood. These cars were powered by BMC's Courthouse Green's tuned engines and eventually produced a reliable 110 bhp, which enabled a top speed of around 150 mph on the Mulsanne Straight. One-off gearboxes were also made at Courthouse Green, with MGB gearboxes modified with an externally mounted 5th gear and overdrive in some cases. BMC works entries recorded class wins at Sebring with drivers including Stirling Moss, Bruce McLaren and Steve McQueen, as well as competing in the Targa Florio and Mugello sports car races.

== Australian production ==
Sprites were imported into Australia in completely knocked down (CKD) kit form and assembled by the Pressed Metal Corporation at Enfield, in New South Wales. Models assembled in Australia included the Mk 1, 2, 2A, 3 and 3A.

== Innocenti Spider and C Coupé ==
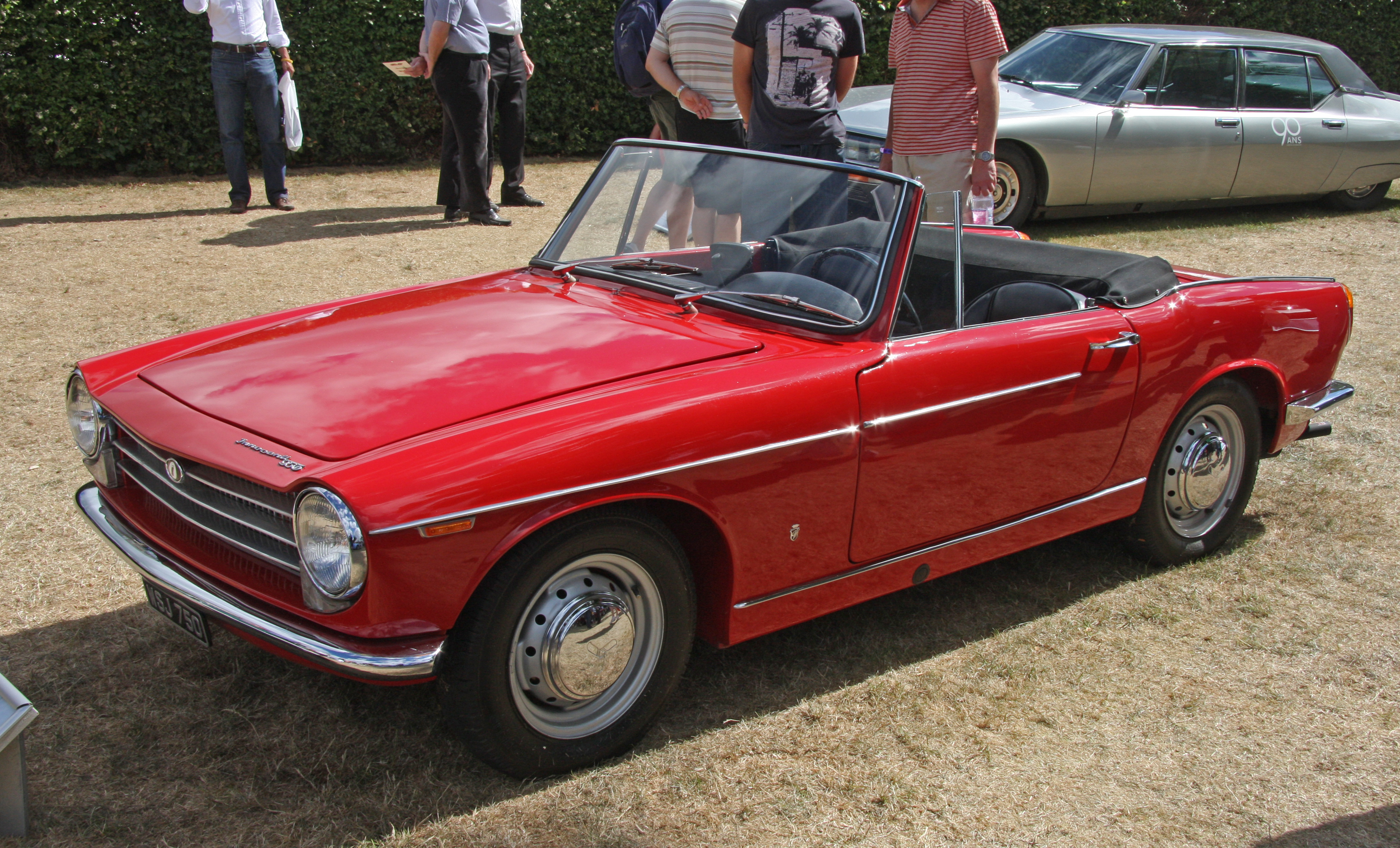
1962 Innocenti 950 Spider

At the 1960 Turin Auto Show, BMC's Italian partner Innocenti showed a small Spider built upon Sprite underpinnings. The car was the first design of Tom Tjaarda's, drawn for Carrozzeria Ghia. Ghia's partner firm OSI built the bodyshells, when the car entered production in early 1961. The original Innocenti 950 Spider had the Frogeye's 948 cc engine with 43 hp (32 kW), 624 of these were built. Later in 1961 an uprated 46.5 hp (35 kW) was installed. In February 1963 the 1098 cc "S" model was introduced, this also had front disc brakes to cope with the extra power. The 1100 has 58 hp (43 kW) and could also be fitted with a removable hardtop. The Spider wasn't a mere reshelling, as the entire bulkhead was moved forward to provide longer doors and a more modern look. Unlike the spartan Frogeye, the Spider also had wind-up windows. 4,790 of the 950 Spiders were built, and 2,074 of the 1100 cc Spiders.

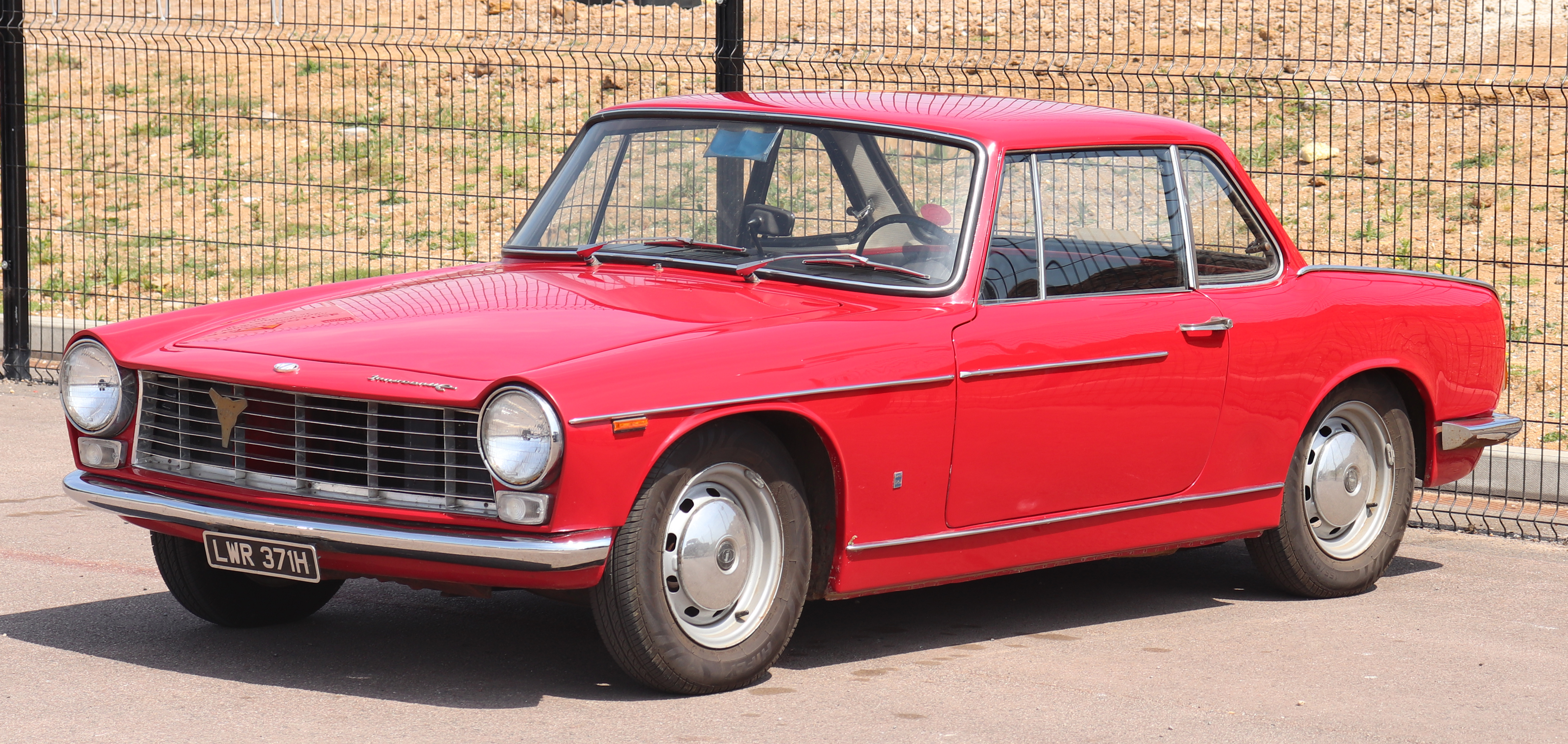
Innocenti C coupé

The Innocenti Spider originally sold well in Italy, with production running at 13 cars per day in 1962, but it had a hard time competing against the cheaper Sprite in export markets. As more modern competitors arrived and as the British-built Sprite was modernised, sales dropped precipitously, with only 63 cars built in 1965. Thus, Innocenti presented the reworked Innocenti Coupé in September 1966, still with the same 1100 engine as seen in late Spiders. The badging on the car simply read "Innocenti C". The Coupé's all-new bodywork designed by Sergio Sartorelli was wider and longer than the Spider's, and the wheelbase was extended by 150 mm to 2,180 mm (85.8 in). The floorpan was reworked to allow for the seats to be mounted lower than in a Sprite, making the cabin less cramped. It was competitively priced in the Italian market, slotting nicely between the smaller Fiat 850 Coupé and the bigger Fiat 124 Sport Spider. Only 794 were built when production ended in 1968.

== Lenham GT Coupe ==
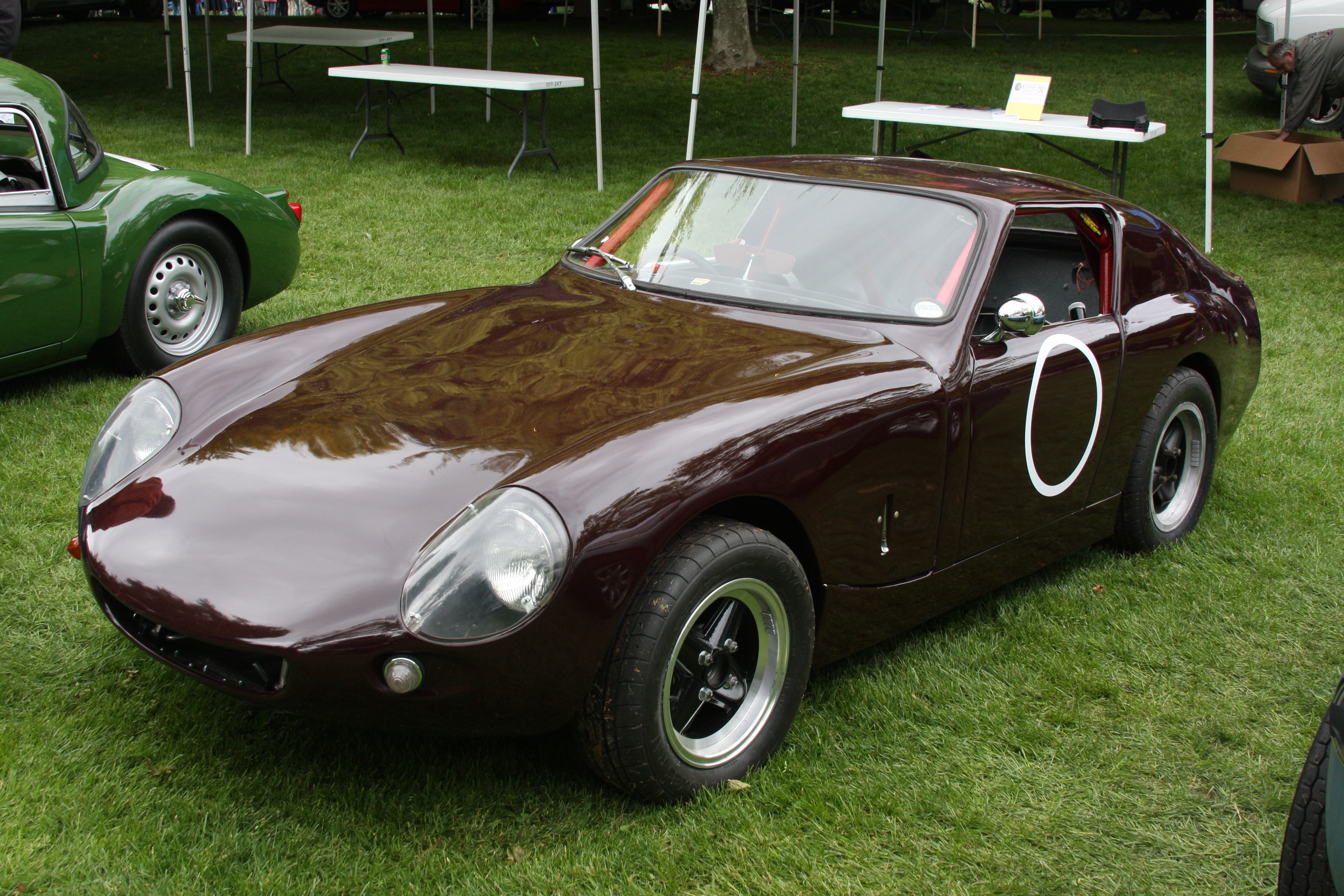
1961 Lenham GT Coupe, based upon the Austin-Healey Sprite

The Lenham Motor Company of Kent, founded in 1960, was, and still is, one of the once many "cottage industry" automotive companies providing specialist conversions based upon commercial brand platforms. Best known for its Spridget coupé conversions and the big-Healey based Lenham Healey (a replica of the Healey Silverstone), the firm also produced hard-tops for Jaguar E-types, Triumphs, the Jensen-Healey, the Lotus Elan and for the MGB.

== Tifosi Rana Frogeye replica ==
The Tifosi Rana Frogeye Sprite replica retains a significant amount of the character and appeal of the original version by using the MG Midget as its basis. As the MG Midget traces its roots directly back to the original Austin Healey ‘Frogeye’, the Tifosi replica perhaps merits the sobriquet "Spridget" even more than the originals. They are supplied and/or built by Halls Garage near Bourne in Lincolnshire, home of the now defunct BRM Formula 1 racing cars.

The Tifosi Rana replica has a fibreglass body with upgrades such as external door handles and wind-up windows as standard. A "Custom package" allows a purchaser to specify various choices of engine, transmission suspension, paint and trim.

=== The Frogeye Car Company ===
Keith Brading started Frogeye Car company on the Isle of Wight in the 1980s. The first examples of these cars were restoration kits which used a ladder frame chassis to do away with the often rusted-out original body shell. Brading was known to Geoffrey Healey through a mutual friend and because he, at one stage, owned the two prototype 3000 coupes.

Geoffrey Healey notes that Brading's re-design of the "Frogeye" was shortly to receive approval from Donald Healey, calling the concept "brilliant", and after some modifications, "just the vehicle to carry the Healey approval".

The last sports car to have his father's approval benefited from Geoffrey Healey's direct input until his unexpected death in 1994 and the car he used is still owned by Keith Brading. Another “engineering superstar” who also contributed to the Healey Frogeye development was John Ackroyd who designed Thrust2, which held the world land speed record from 4 October 1983 to 25 September 1997.

The Frogeye Car Company was a sideline to Keith Brading's main business, and no cars have been manufactured since 1998.

== UK 50th anniversary celebration ==
On 24 May 2008, the official UK golden anniversary of the introduction of the Austin Healey Sprite, "Spridget 50 – The Big Party" was held at the British Heritage Motor Centre at Gaydon, Warwickshire. Up to 1000 Sprites, Midgets and derivatives were in attendance – a record number. The event was jointly organised and promoted by the UK's Midget and Sprite Club, Healey Drivers Club, MG Owners Club, Austin Healey Club and MG Car Club – the first time an event of this size has been supported by all of the marque-representing clubs.

== See also ==
- Sprite Car Club of Australia
