= MG Midget =

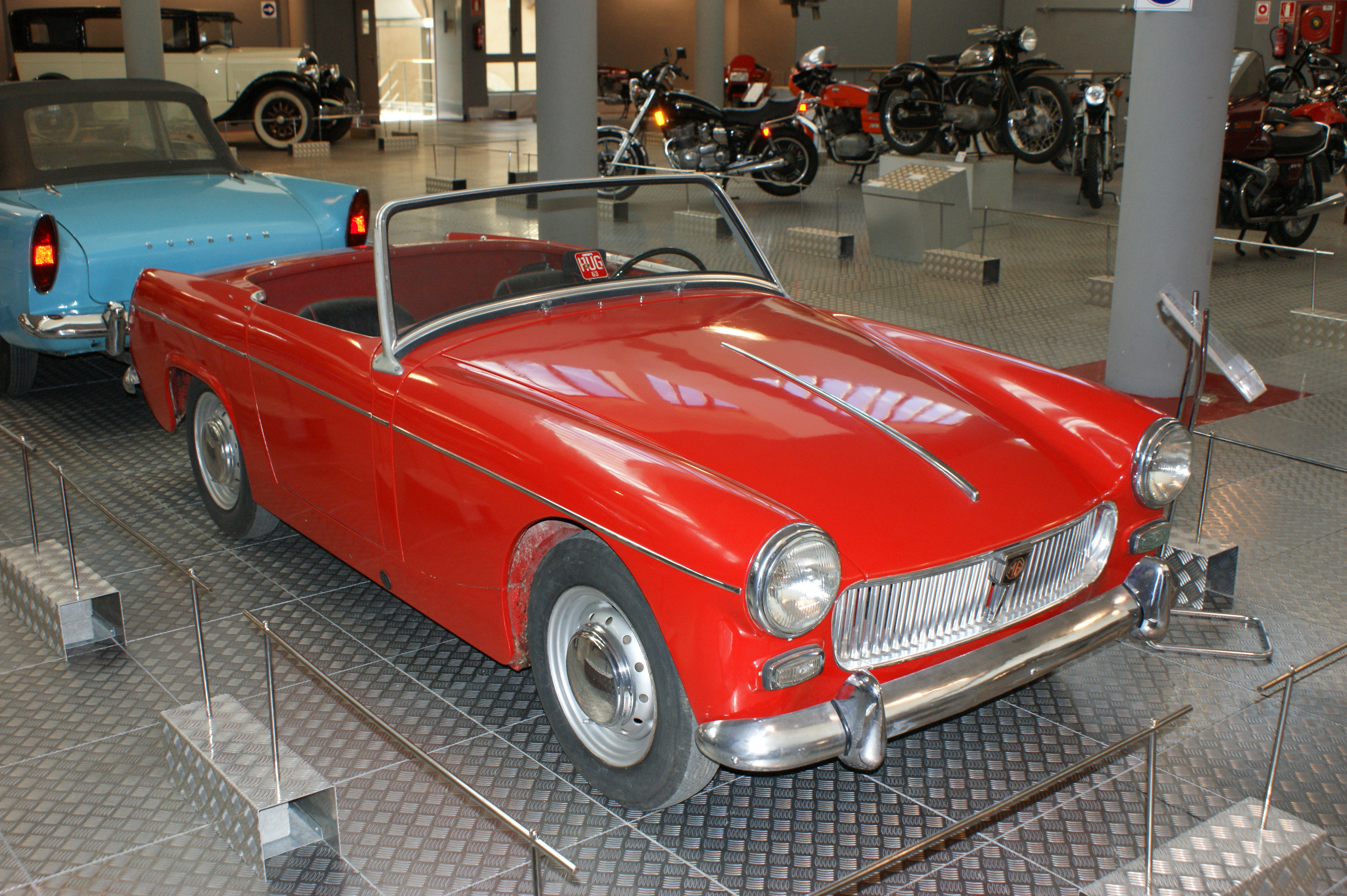
- MG Midget Mark I (1963)

Overview
- Manufacturer: MG (BMC, later British Leyland)
- Production: 1961–1979
- Assembly: United Kingdom: Abingdon, England; Australia

Body and chassis
- Class: Sports car
- Body style: 2-door roadster
- Layout: Front mid engine rear drive
- Related: Austin-Healey Sprite

Powertrain
- Engine: MkI: 948 cc A-Series I4; MkII: 1.1L (1098 cc) A-Series I4; MkIII: 1.3L (1275 cc) A-Series I4; MkIV: 1.5L (1493 cc) Standard SC I4

Dimensions
- Wheelbase: 80 in (2,032 mm)
- Length: 137 in (3,480 mm)
- Width: Mk I and II 54 in (1,372 mm); Mk III and 1500 55 in (1,397 mm)
- Height: 48.5 in (1,232 mm) (before springs enlarged for 1974 rubber bumper cars)
- Curb weight: 735 kg (1,620 lb) (approx.)

Chronology
- Successor: MG F / MG TF

The MG Midget is a small two-seater lightweight sports car produced by MG from 1961 to 1979. It revived a name that had been used on earlier models such as the MG M-type, MG D-type, MG J-type and MG T-type.

== MG Midget MkI (1961–1964) ==
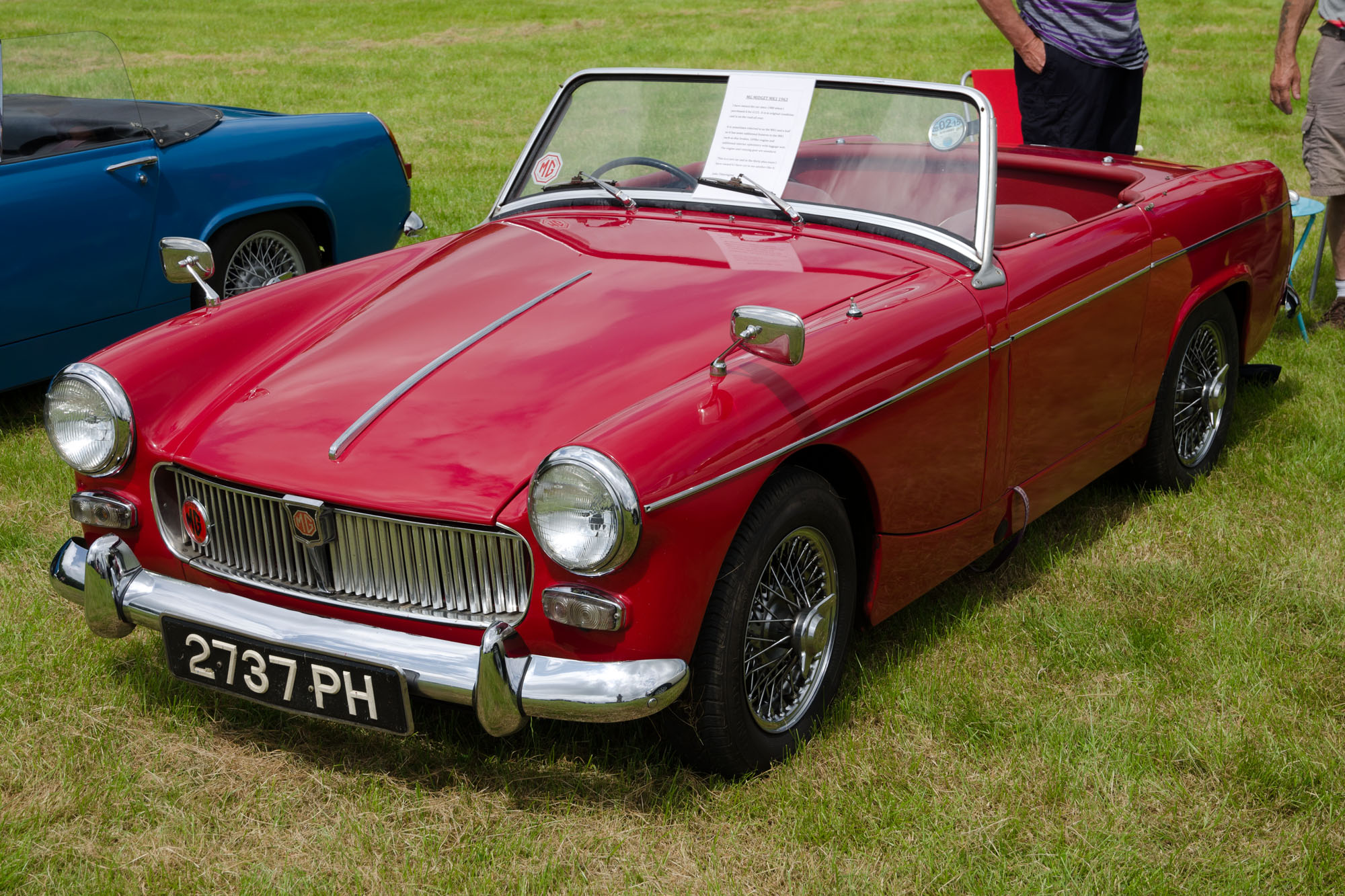
MG Midget Mk 1 (with optional wire wheels)

The first version, announced at the end of June 1961, was essentially a slightly more expensive badge-engineered version of the MkII Austin-Healey Sprite deluxe version. The original 'frogeye' Sprite had been introduced specifically to fill the gap in the market left by the end of production of the MG T-type Midget as its replacement; the MGA had been a significantly larger and more expensive car with greater performance. Many existing MG buyers turned to the Sprite to provide a modern low-cost sports car and so a badge-engineered MG version reusing the Midget name made sense. The new Midget differed from the Sprite only in grille design, badging, improved interior trim, better instruments and added external polished trim to justify its higher price.

Mechanically the car was identical to its Austin-Healey counterpart, retaining the rear suspension using quarter-elliptic leaf springs and trailing arms from the 'frogeye'. The engine was a 948 cc A-Series with twin SU carburettors producing 46 hp (34 kW) at 5500 rpm and 53 lb⋅ft (72 N⋅m) at 3000 rpm. Brakes were 7-inch (178 mm) drums all round. A hard top, heater, radio and luggage rack were available as factory-fitted extras.

In October 1962, the engine was increased to 1098 cc, raising the output to 56 hp (42 kW) at 5500 rpm and 62 lb⋅ft (84 N⋅m) at 3250 rpm, and disc brakes replaced the drums at the front. This change greatly improved braking at speed, as the original tiny drum setup originated from the Morris Minor, and was wholly inadequate in the Midget. 13x4" wire-spoked wheels became available. These early 1098 cc engines were not as reliable as the 948 cc units, as the 1098 cc versions suffered from crankshaft bearing failures when run hard.

The doors had no external handles or locks and the windows were sliding Perspex side-screens. A heater was an optional extra.

Production was 16,080 of the small-engined version and 9601 of the 1098cc version.

A car with the 948 cc engine was tested by the British magazine The Motor in 1962 and had a top speed of 87.9 mph (141.5 km/h) and could accelerate from 0-60 mph (97 km/h) in 18.3 seconds. A fuel consumption of 40.2 miles per imperial gallon (7.03 L/100 km; 33.5 mpg_{‑US}) was recorded. The test car cost £689 including taxes on the UK market.

== MG Midget MkII (1964–1966) ==
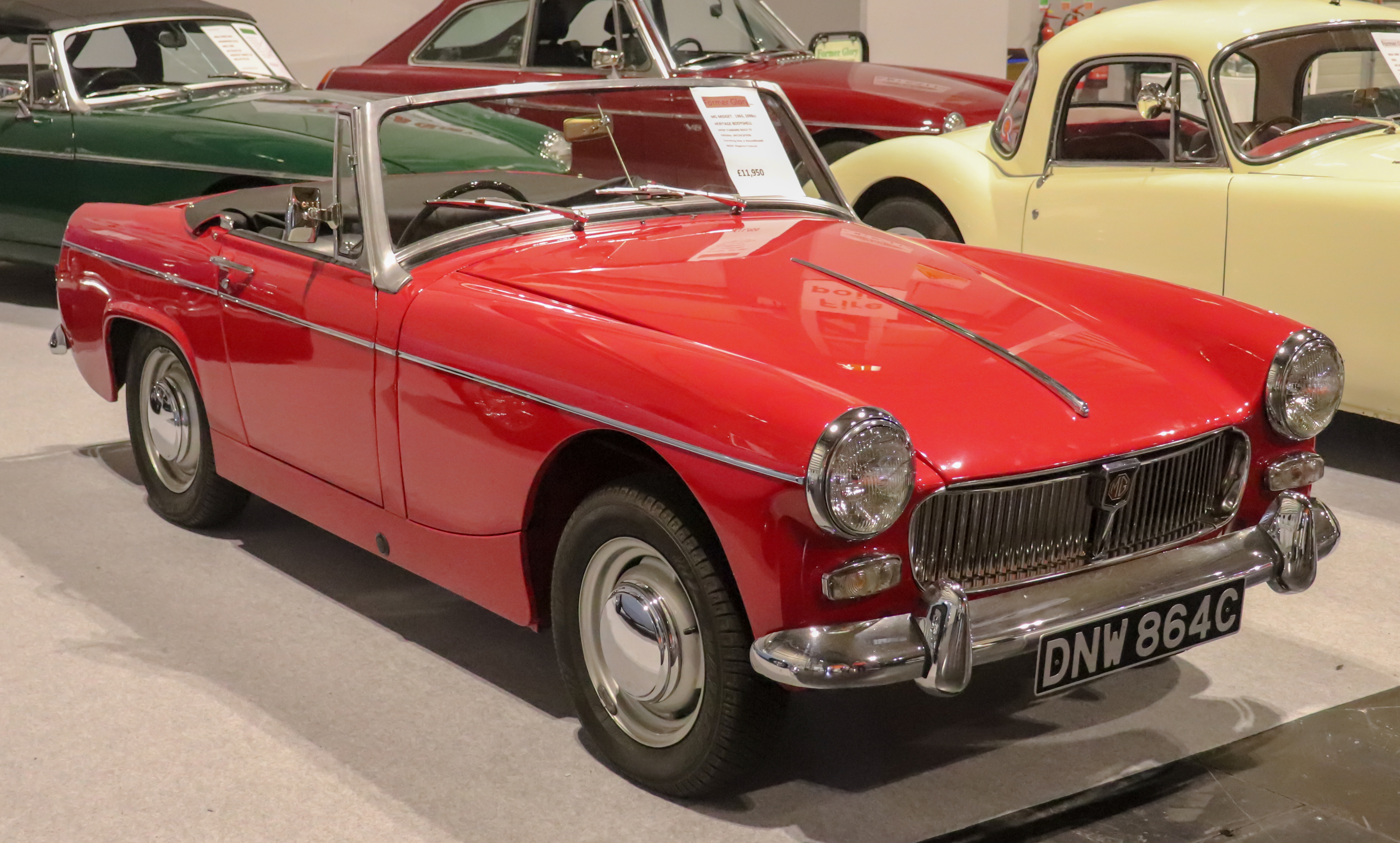
1965 MG Midget Mark II

Externally the main changes were to the doors, which gained wind-up windows, swivelling quarter lights (AKA wing windows), external handles, and separate locks. The windscreen gained a slight curvature and was retained in a more substantial frame. The hood (US – top), though modified, continued to have a removable frame that had to be erected before the cover was put on. The rear springs were replaced by more conventional semi-elliptic types, which gave a better ride. The engine block was strengthened and larger main bearings were fitted, increasing the power to 59 hp (44 kW) at 5750 rpm and torque to 65 lb⋅ft (88 N⋅m) at 3500 rpm.

A total of 26,601 were made.

== MG Midget MkIII (1966–1974) ==
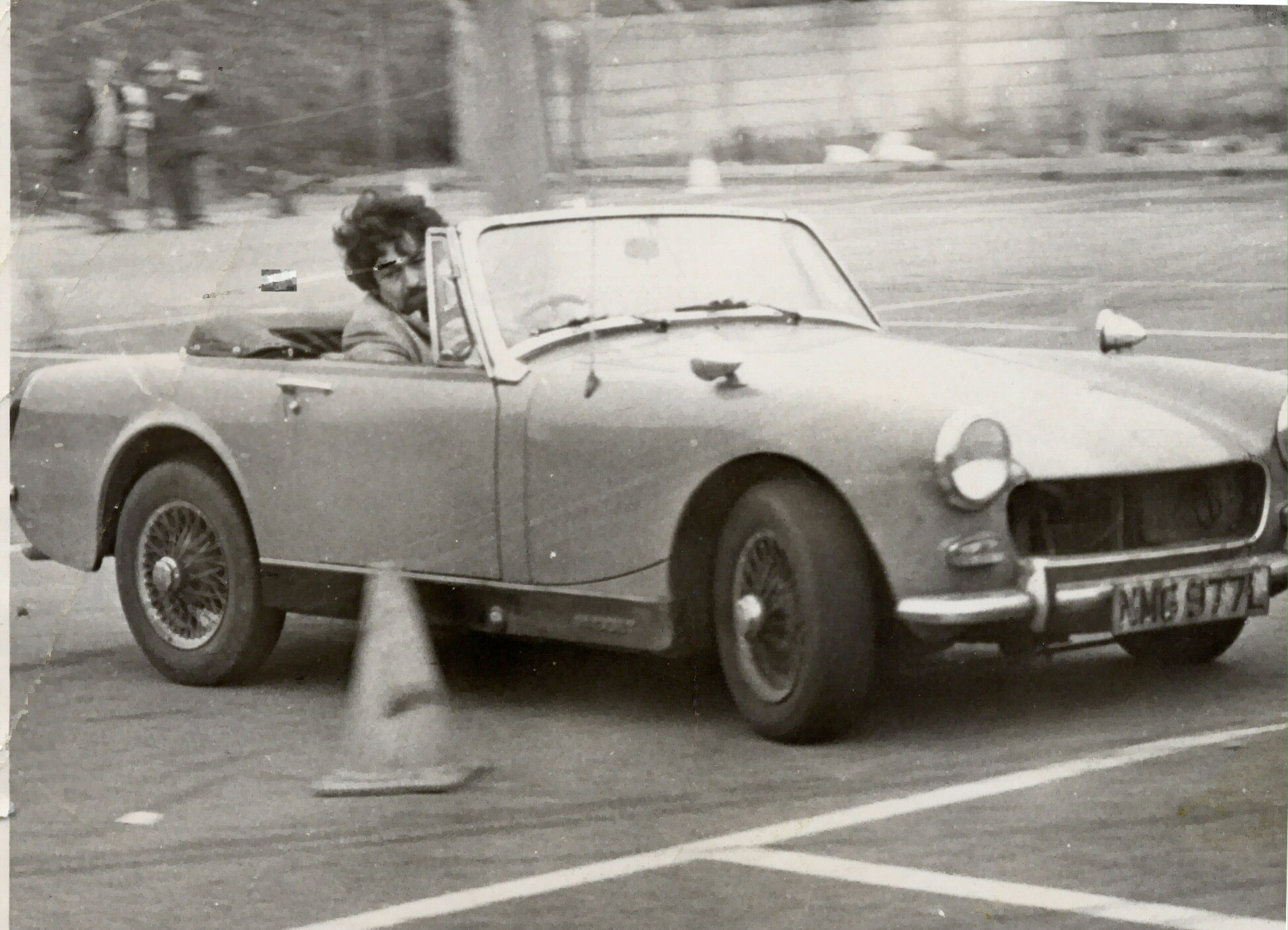
Round wheel arch MG Midget on Autotest

The engine grew to 1275 cc using the development seen on the Mini-Cooper 'S'. Enthusiasts were disappointed that this was a detuned version of the 76 bhp (57 kW) at 5800 rpm Cooper 'S' engine, giving only 65 hp (48 kW) at 6000 rpm and 72 lb⋅ft (98 N⋅m) at 3000 rpm. A reduced compression ratio of 8.8:1 was used instead of the 9.75:1 employed on the Cooper S engine. The Midget used the 12G940 cylinder head casting that was common to other BMC 1300 cars, whereas the Cooper 'S' had a special head with not only larger inlet, but also larger exhaust valves; however, these exhaust valves caused many 'S' heads to fail through cracking between the valve seats. The detuned engine was used for reasons of model range placement – with the Cooper 'S' spec engine, the Midget could have been faster than the more expensive MGB. The hydraulic system gained a separate master cylinder for the clutch. The hood was now permanently attached to the car, with an improved mechanism with easier operation.

In late 1967 (1968 model year), US-spec cars received several safety additions: a padded fascia (dashboard) with smaller main gauges, collapsible steering column, scissor-type hood hinges, a third windshield wiper, additional side marker lights, and anti-burst door latches.

In Dec 1968, beginning s/n 66236, the rear axle gear ratio was increased from 4.22:1 to 3.90:1, giving 16.5 mph (26.6 km/h) for every 1000 rpm. This increased final drive ratio gave better fuel economy, but reduced acceleration.

MG made minor facelift changes to the body trim in late 1969 (1970 model year), with the sills painted black, a revised recessed black grille, and squared off taillights as on the MGB. The 13-inch Rubery Owen "Rostyle" wheels were standardized, but wire-spoked ones remained an option, fitted with either 5.20x13 Crossply tyres or 145HR13 Pirelli Cinturato CA67. These revised cars were initially presented with a matte-black-painted windscreen surround which proved so unpopular, the Midget reverted to the original brushed alloy after only a few hundred had been manufactured.

In August 1971, the compression ratio on North American engines was reduced to 8.0:1. Engine power output fell to 54.5 bhp (41 kW) at 5500 rpm and 67 lb⋅ft (91 N⋅m) at 3250 rpm.

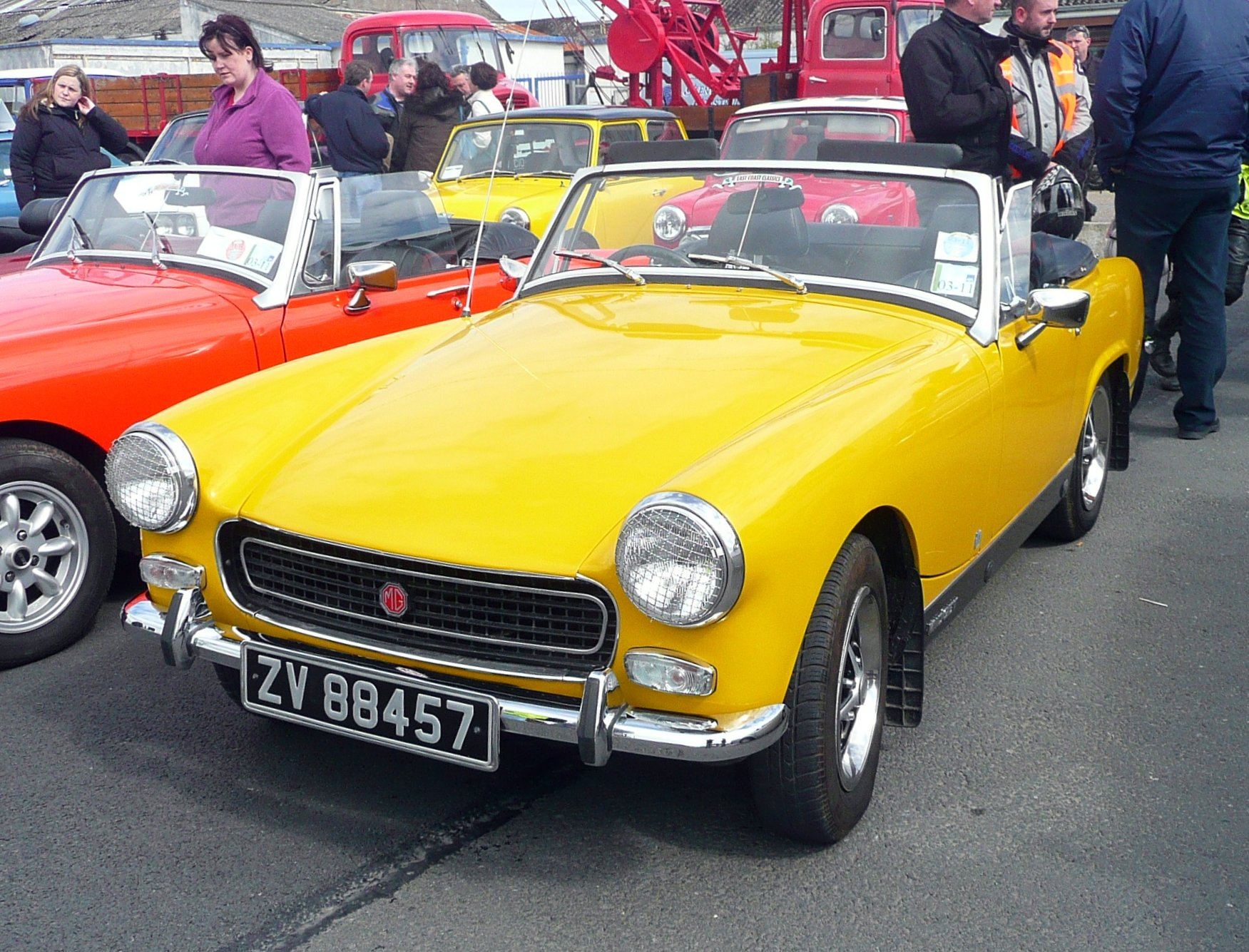
Facelift MG Midget with new grille, black sills

The square-shaped rear wheel arches became rounded in January 1972. Also in this year, a Triumph steering rack was fitted, giving a gearing that was somewhat lower than earlier Midgets. A second exhaust silencer was also added in 1972. Alternators were fitted instead of dynamos (generators) from 1973 onwards.

Seven months into the 1974 model year, oversized rubber bumper blocks, nicknamed "Sabrinas" after the well-endowed British actress, were added to the chrome bumpers to meet the first US bumper impact regulations.

The round-arch Midgets with chrome bumpers marketed for model years 1972-1974 started leaving the Abingdon factory in late 1971. Between 1966 and the 1969 face lift, 22,415 were made, and a further 77,831 up to 1974.

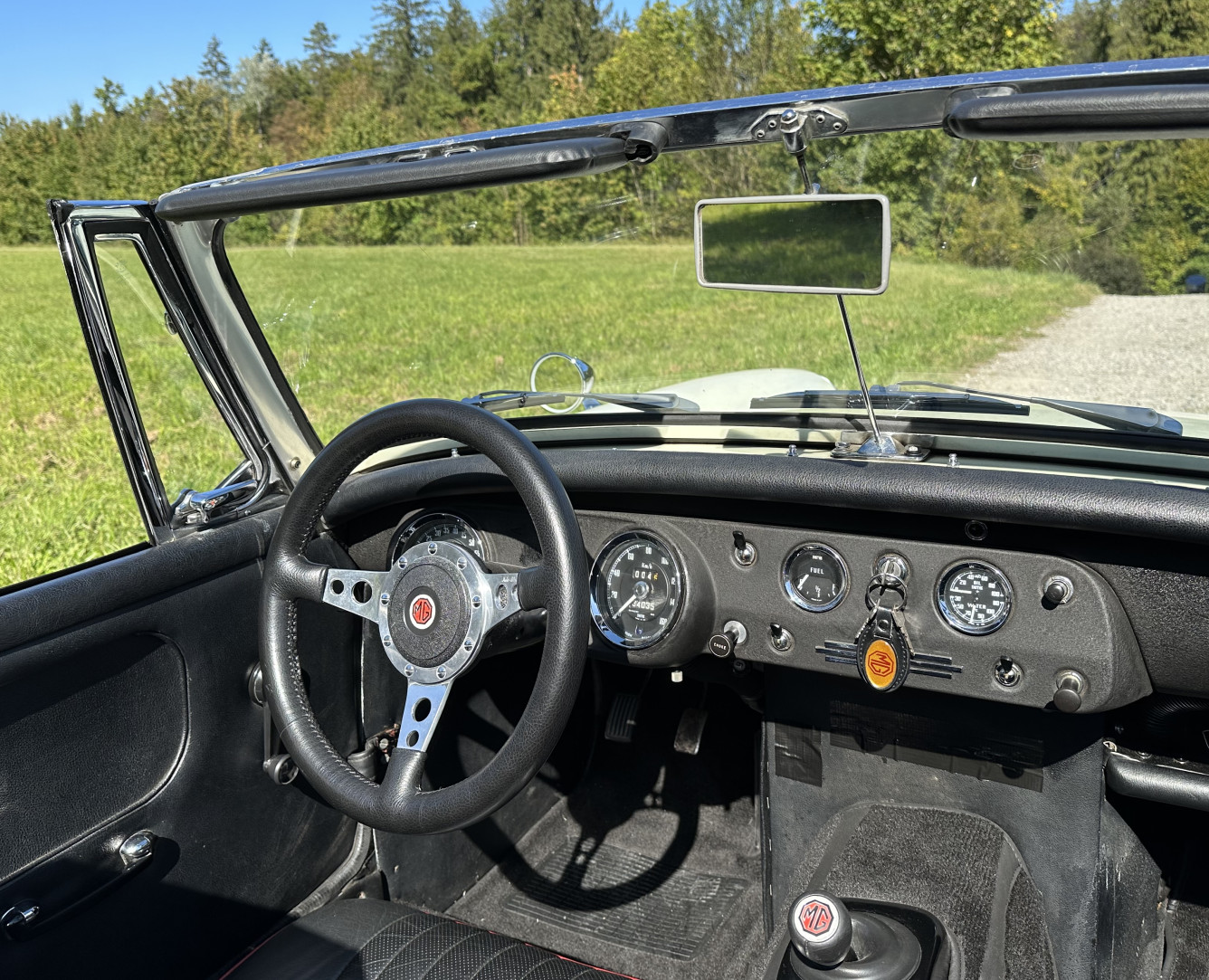
MG Midget MKIII (1969) cockpit

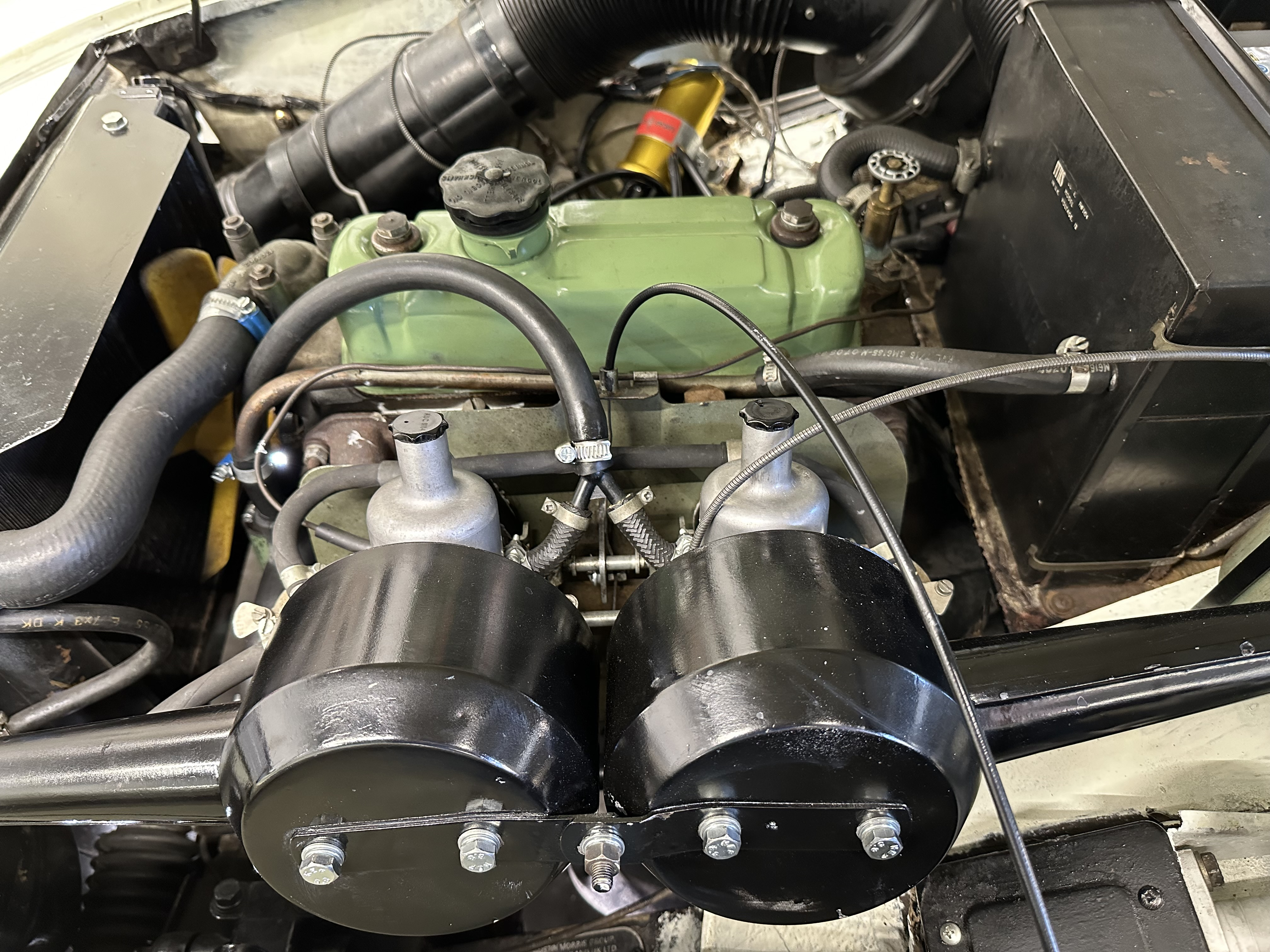
MG Midget MKIII (1969) engine

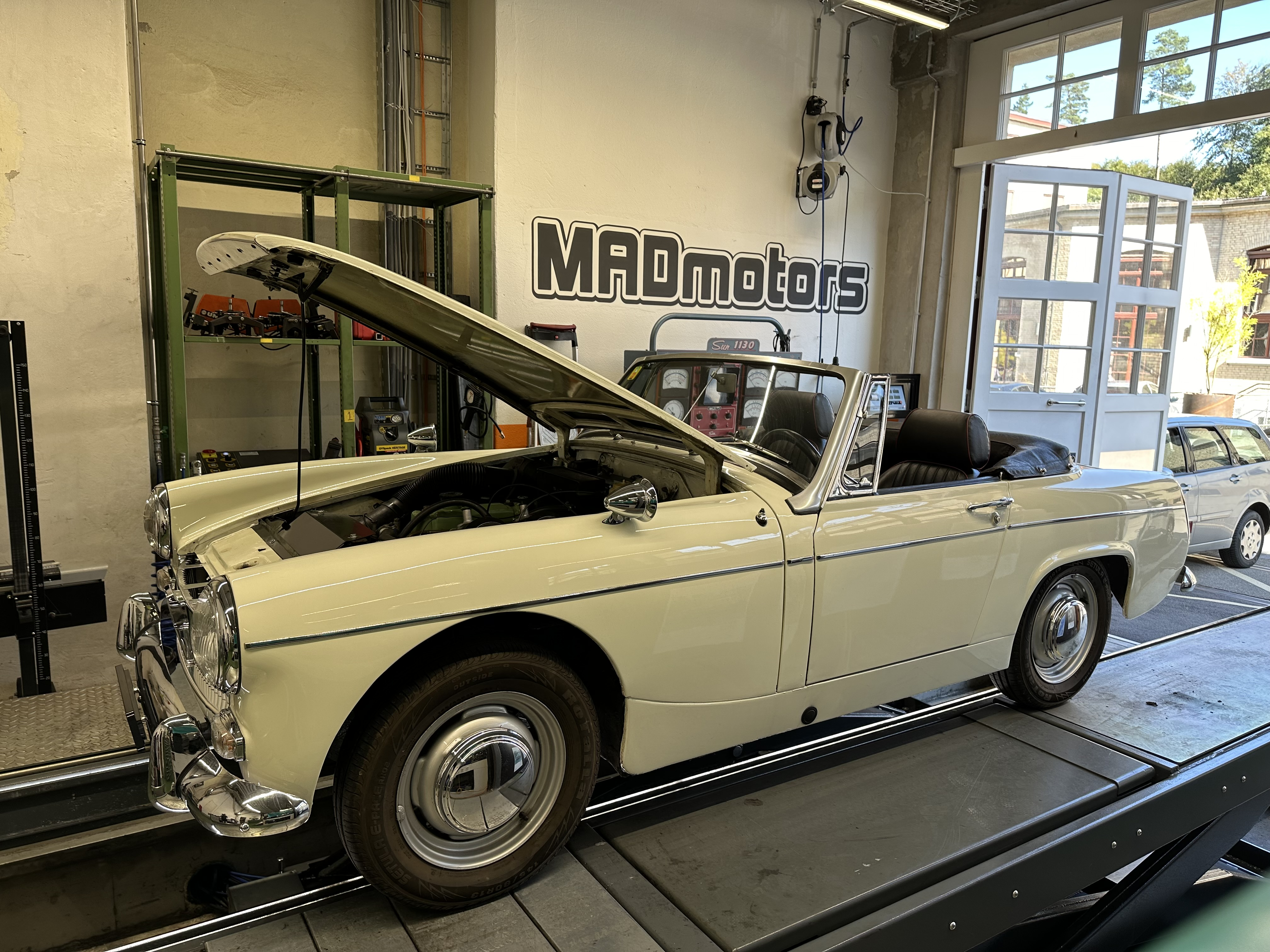
MG Midget MKIII (1969) with square-shaped rear wheel arches

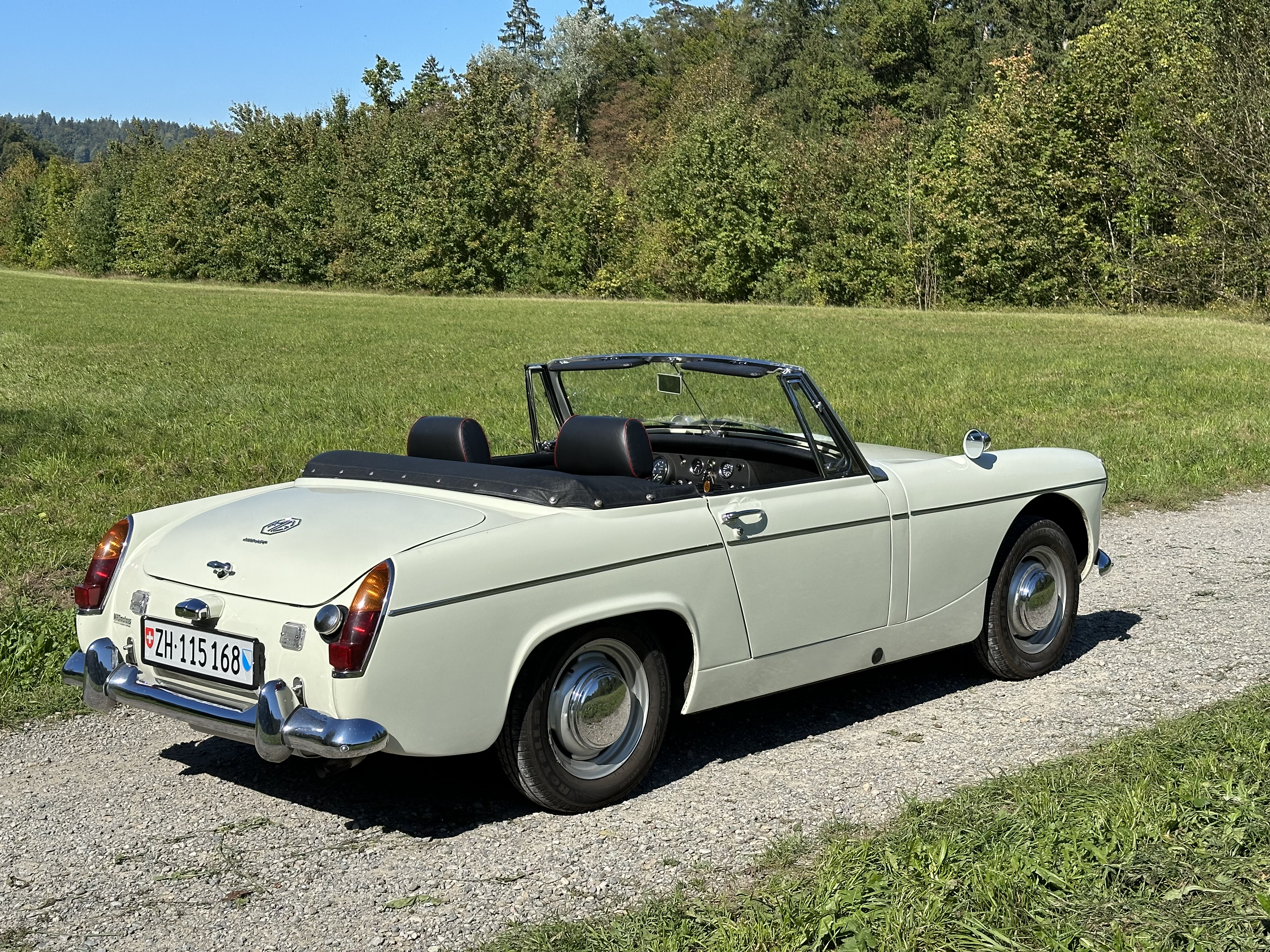
MG Midget MKIII (1969) open top

== MG Midget 1500 (1974–1980) ==
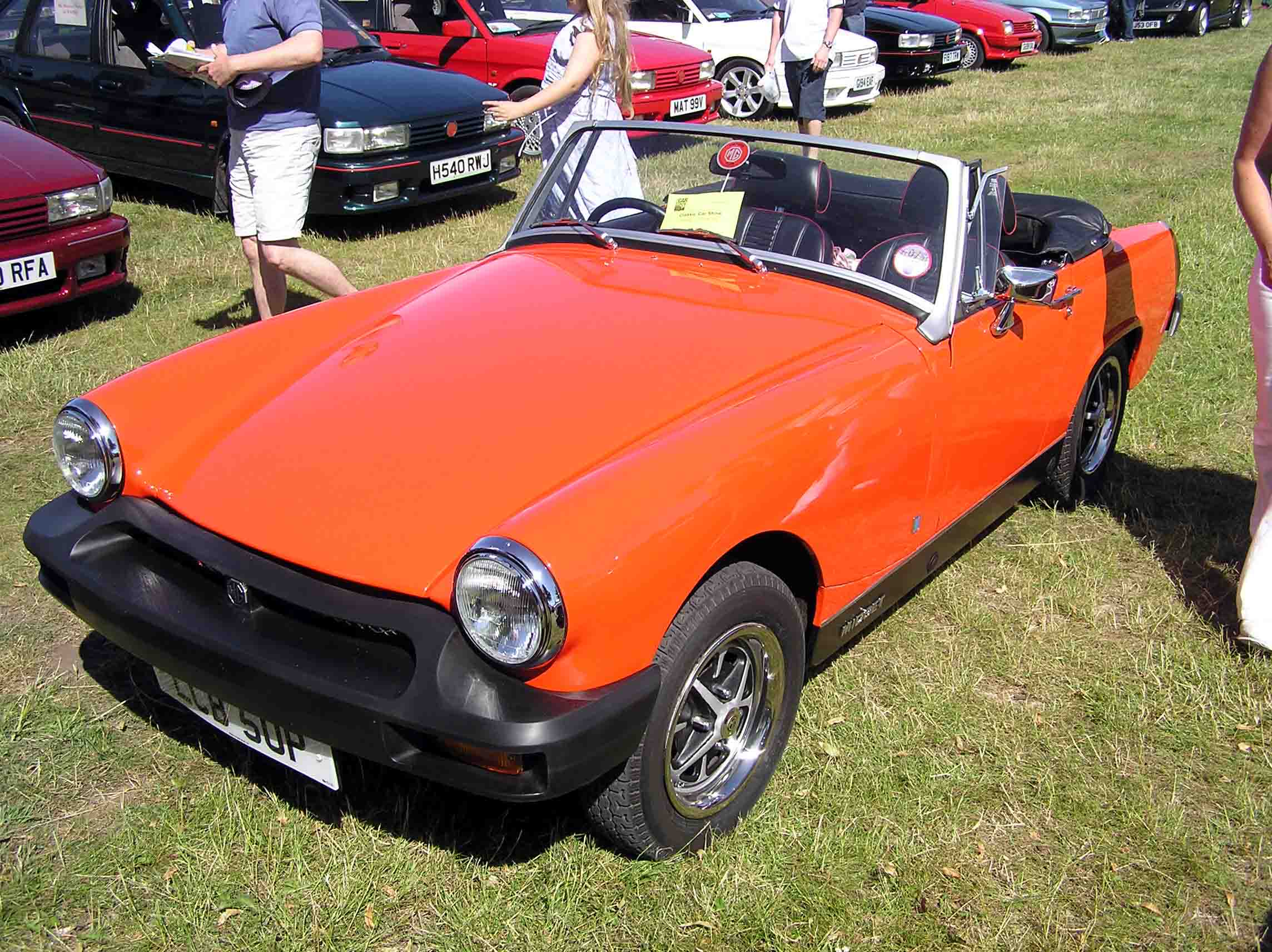
1976 MG Midget 1500

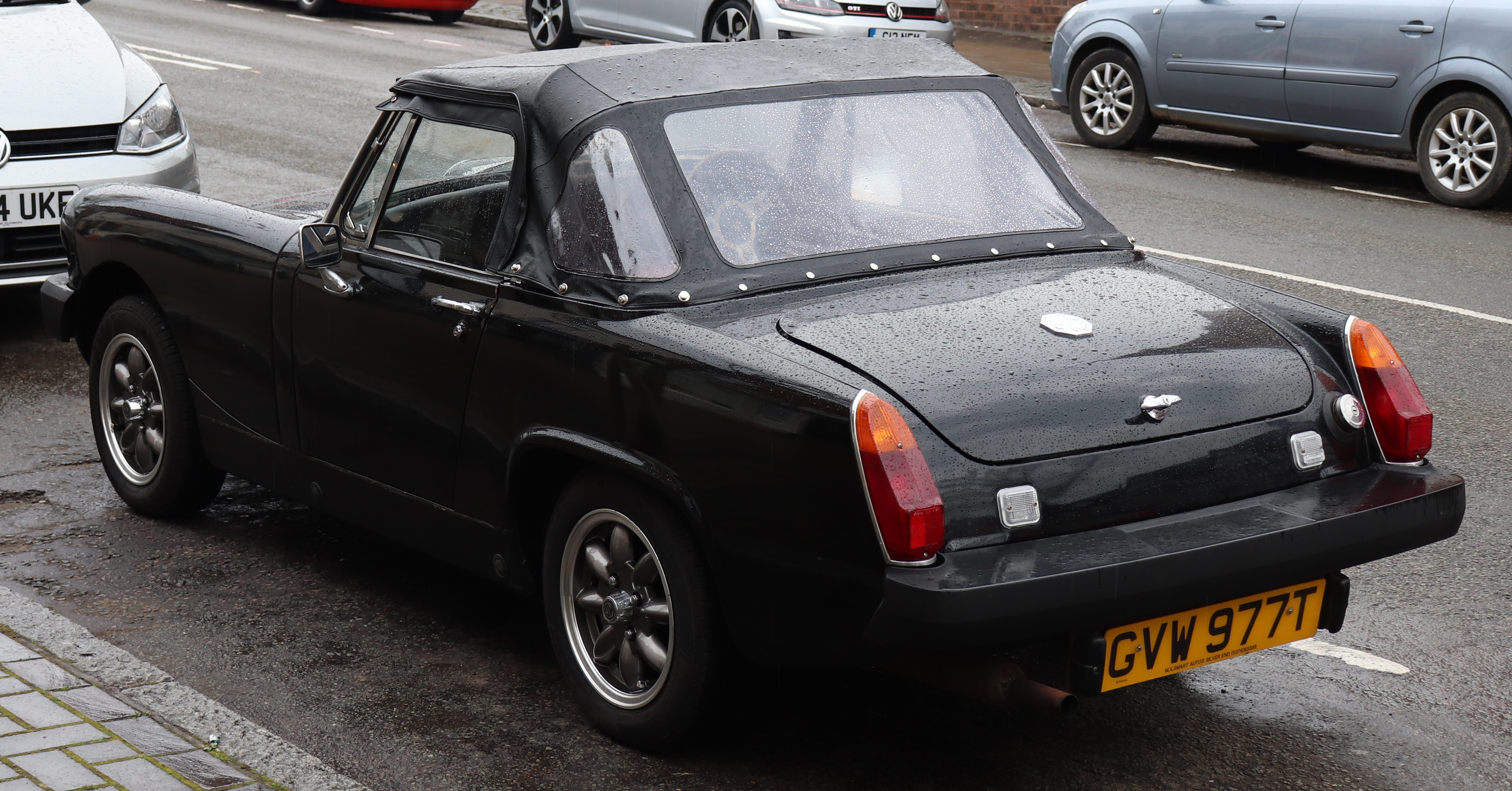
1979 MG Midget 1500

To meet US federal regulations, large black plastic-covered bumpers were added to the front and rear and the ride heights were increased. The increased ride height affected handling and anti-roll bars were added to help with the higher centre of gravity. The A-Series engine was replaced by the 1493 cc Standard SC engine from the Triumph Spitfire, coupled to a modified Morris Marina gearbox with synchromesh on all four gears. The increased displacement of the new engine was better able to cope with the increasing emission regulations. Although the horsepower ratings were similar at 65 hp (48 kW) in home market specifications with twin SU HS4 carbs, the 1493 cc engine produced more torque. The increased output combined with taller gear ratios resulted in faster acceleration (12 seconds 0–60 compared to 13 for the 1275 cc version) and top speed of just over 100 mph.

In the US market, British Leyland struggled to keep engine power at acceptable levels as the engines were loaded with air pumps, EGR valves, and catalytic converters to keep up with new US and California exhaust emission control regulations. The U.S market model's dual SU HS2 carbs were swapped for a single Zenith-Stromberg 150 CD4 unit catalytic converter carb in 1976 and all models after came with the Zenith-Stromberg 150 CD4T. Power fell to 50 hp (37 kW) at 5000 rpm and 67 lb-ft of torque at 2500 rpm. The round rear-wheel arches were now square again, to increase the body strength, and the front arches were lowered to minimize the gap from raising the suspension. The last car was made on 7 December 1979, after 73,899 of the last version had been made. The last 500 home-market cars were painted black.

== ADO34 ==
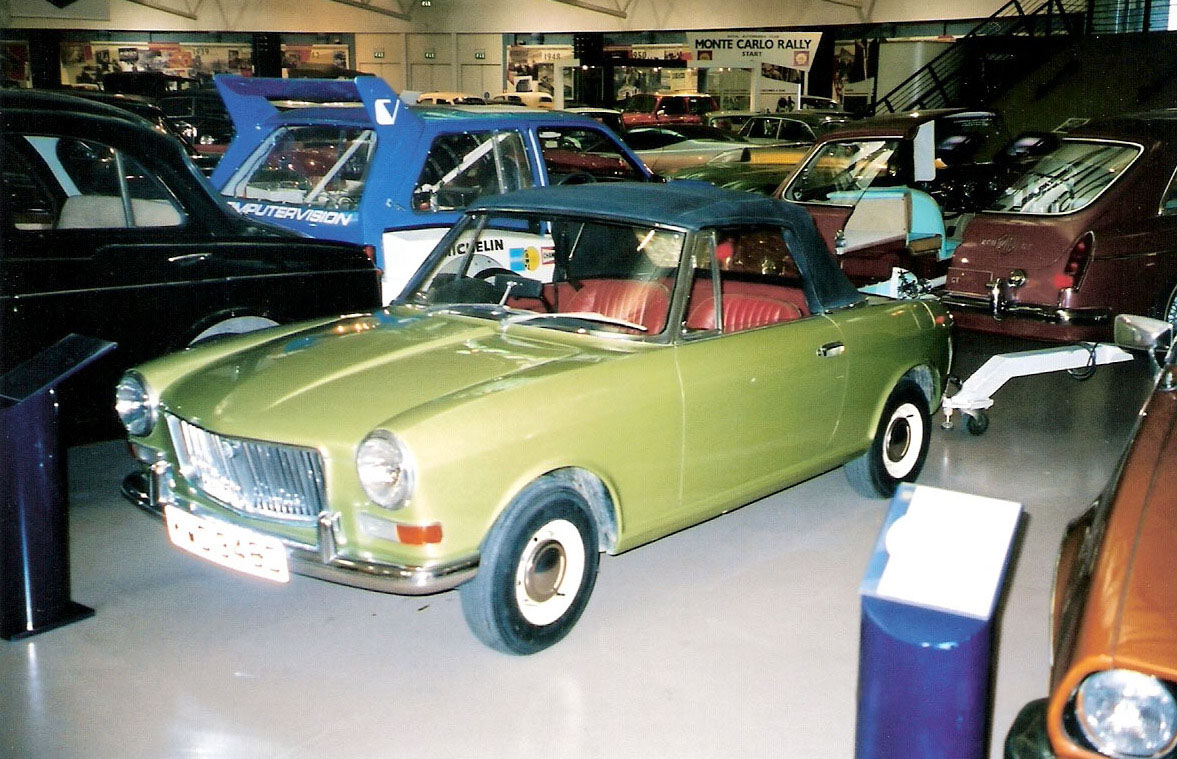
Mini-based MG Midget concept car that never made it to production. (Photo taken in 2003 at the Heritage Motor Centre in Gaydon)

ADO34 was the name of a project active between 1960 and 1964 that aimed to develop a front-wheel drive Mini-based roadster as a possible new MG Midget or Austin-Healey Sprite. Following the launch of the MG Midget in 1961, it was considered as an MG Midget or Austin Healey Sprite replacement. This Pininfarina project was cancelled in about 1964.

== MG Midget racing coupés ==
MG racing driver and garage owner Dick Jacobs persuaded Abingdon to build a pair of special lightweight Midgets with a GT body shape inspired by the Aston Martin DB4. The roof used the front part of the standard Midget hardtop, while the rear portion and the windshield were custom. A quick release fuel filler was placed beneath the rear windshield to the right. The nose was redesigned by Syd Enever to improve the aerodynamic efficiency—wind tunnel tests showed that the new body required 13 hp less to achieve 100 mph than the standard body shape. The cars were registered BJB 770 and BJB 771. A third car was constructed for John Milne of Scotland and all three cars survive. The two loaned to Dick Jacobs were originally fitted with 979 cc A-series engines with twin Webers and approximately 80 hp (60 kW). As campaigned from 1962 to 1963 they received 997 cc (Formula Junior-spec.) BMC A-series engines. For the 1964 season they ran the larger Formula Junior engine at 1139 cc, with a 1287 cc engine using a block derived from the Mini-Cooper 'S' available for events where the coupés ran as prototypes. They were fitted with 18.5-imperial-gallon (84 L) fuel tanks, larger oil coolers, large-bore exhaust systems and dual-circuit brakes.

As the MG Midget model was developed, it gained considerable weight and a higher ride height. Despite larger displacement engines, the later cars are slower and handling is adversely affected. Many in the U.S. consider the 1967 model year to exhibit the best stock performance; the 1275 cc engine was unencumbered by power-sapping smog-reducing equipment and the added weight of the later giant bumpers.

== See also ==
- Sprite Car Club of Australia (includes MG Midgets)
