= Sprite Car Club of Australia =

- Sport: Cruising, motor racing, motorkhana
- Abbreviation: SCCA
- Founded: 1960
- Regional affiliation: Sydney, New South Wales, Australia

Official website
- www.spriteclub.com
- (Australia)

The Sprite Car Club of Australia is a club founded in 1960 for owners and enthusiasts of Austin-Healey Sprites and MG Midget cars. It was established by seven enthusiasts at a BMC car dealership in Sydney, for owners of Austin-Healey Sprite Bugeyes also known as Frogeye which started assembly in 1958 at Abingdon, Oxfordshire, England. Later from 1959, Sprites were shipped to Australia completely knocked down Complete knock down kit form to be assembled at Pressed Metal Corporation, at Enfield, New South Wales in Sydney (a BMC subsidiary located near a major rail interchange). The range of models assembled in Australia included the Mk 1, 2, 2A, 3, 3A Sprites, and the Mk3 Midget.

The club, which is the oldest Sprite Car Club still in operation, has grown to over 300 members from all parts over NSW and USA and England.
