= Chrysler Valiant (VK) =

Australian full-size car

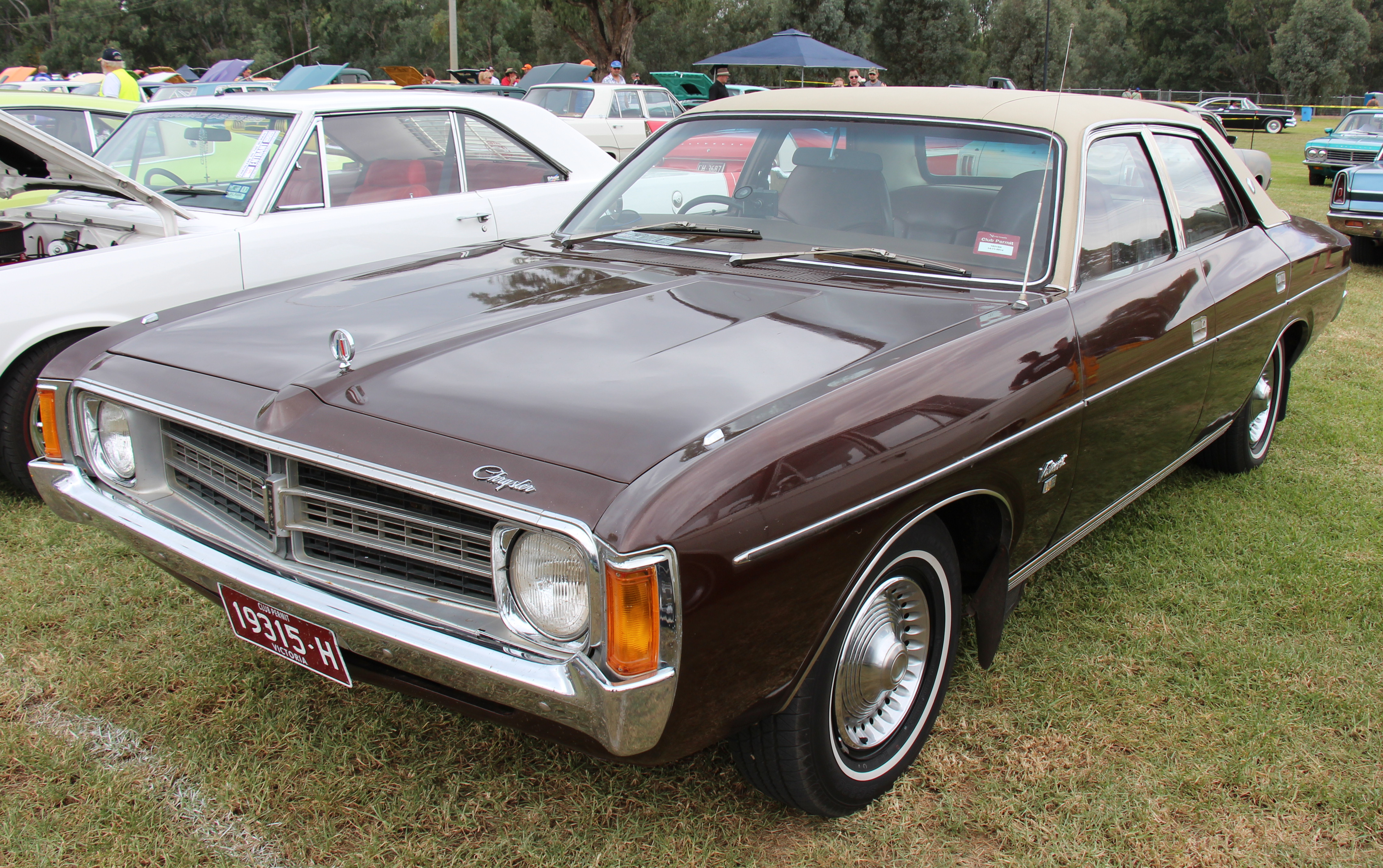
- Chrysler Valiant Regal sedan (VK)

Overview
- Manufacturer: Chrysler Australia
- Also called: Dodge Utility
- Production: October 1975 – October 1976
- Assembly: Australia: Tonsley Park; New Zealand: Petone (Todd Motors)

Body and chassis
- Body style: 4-door sedan 5-door station wagon 2-door coupé 2-door coupé utility
- Layout: FR layout
- Related: Chrysler by Chrysler (CK)

Powertrain
- Engine: 215 cu in (3.5 L) I6; 245 cu in (4.0 L) I6; 265 cu in (4.3 L) I6; 318 cu in (5.2 L) V8; 360 cu in (5.9 L) V8
- Transmission: 3-speed manual 4 speed manual 3 speed automatic

Dimensions
- Wheelbase: Sedan: 111.0 inches (2819 mm); Charger coupe: 105 (2667 mm)
- Length: Sedan: 192.7 inches (4895 mm)
- Width: Sedan: 74.8 inches (1900 mm)
- Kerb weight: Sedan: 3100 lb (1406 kg)

Chronology
- Predecessor: Chrysler Valiant (VJ)
- Successor: Chrysler Valiant (CL)

The Chrysler Valiant (VK) is an automobile which was produced by Chrysler Australia from October 1975 to October 1976. It was the eleventh Australian produced Chrysler Valiant series.

== Overview ==
The Chrysler Valiant VK series was introduced in October 1975, replacing the Valiant VJ series. The VK was essentially a facelift of the VJ with revised grilles, taillights and badging. The VK was intended to have significantly different styling to the VJ, however this did not eventuate due to financial constraints.

The range was rationalised with a reduced number of models and options. The Chrysler name was now promoted more strongly with Chrysler badging displayed prominently on the new models. The Charger was now known as the Chrysler Charger, having previously been promoted as the Valiant Charger by Chrysler.

The six cylinder engines were fitted with a new Carter carburetor. A vacuum operated “Fuel Pacer” was offered as an option, the device using a flashing light to assist the driver in avoiding fuel wastage. This light was initially on the right-hand guard, but was later fitted to the instrument panel. Additional safety features included a pressure proportioning valve in the rear brake circuit, power-boosted brakes and hazard warning lights. Indicator, headlight dipping, headlight flashing and windscreen wiper controls were now housed in a steering column stalk. This was the first multi-purpose stalk control to be fitted by any of the “big three" manufacturers, the other two being Ford and Holden.

== Model range ==
The VK series was offered in 4-door sedan, 5-door station wagon, coupé and coupé utility body styles in the following models:

- Chrysler Valiant Ranger sedan
- Chrysler Valiant Ranger wagon
- Chrysler Valiant Regal sedan
- Chrysler Valiant Regal wagon
- Chrysler Charger XL
- Chrysler Charger 770
- Dodge utility

200 Charger White Knight Specials were produced, based on the Charger XL. Specified via Option Code A50, 100 examples were produced in Arctic White and 100 in Amarante Red.

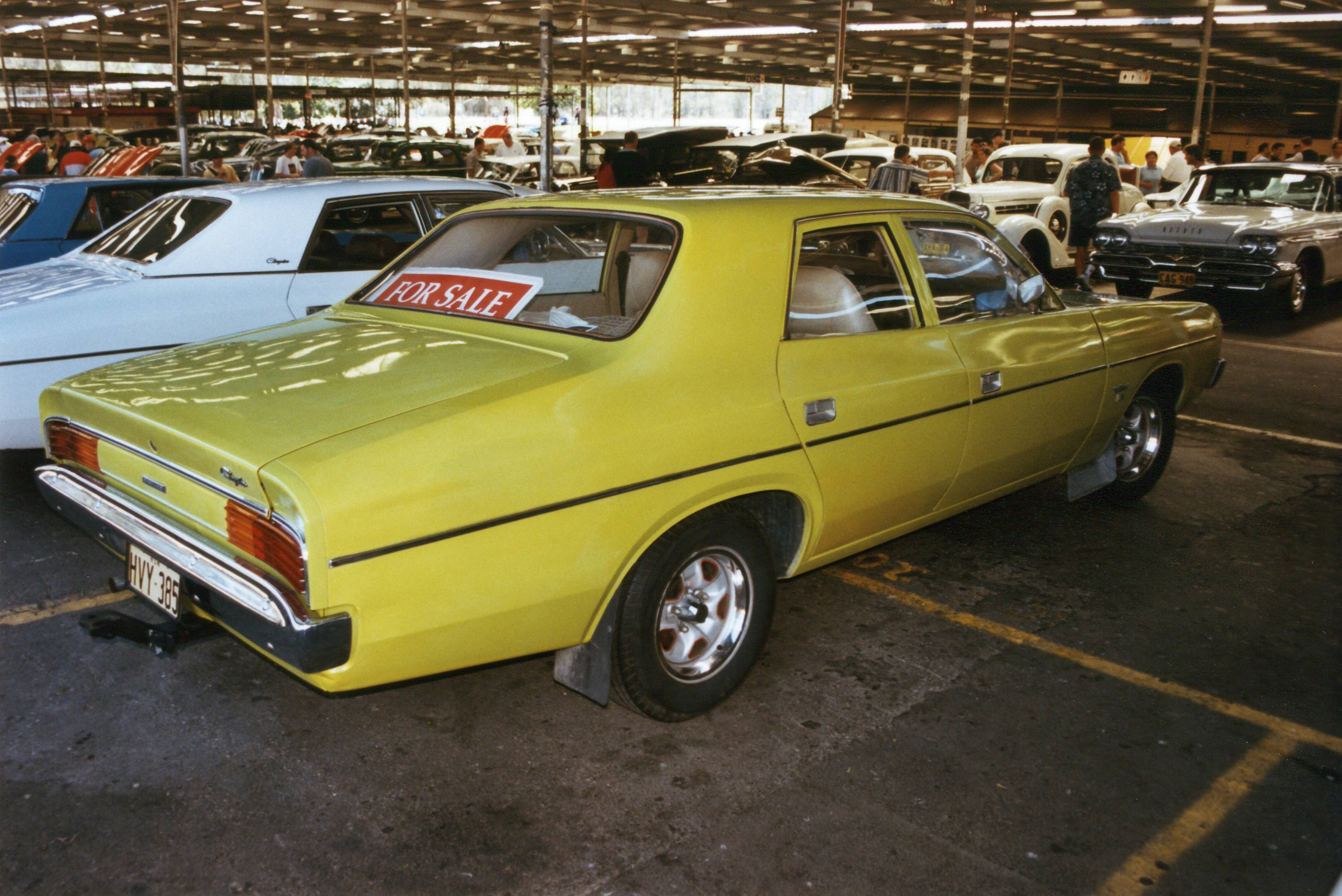
Chrysler VK Valiant Ranger sedan

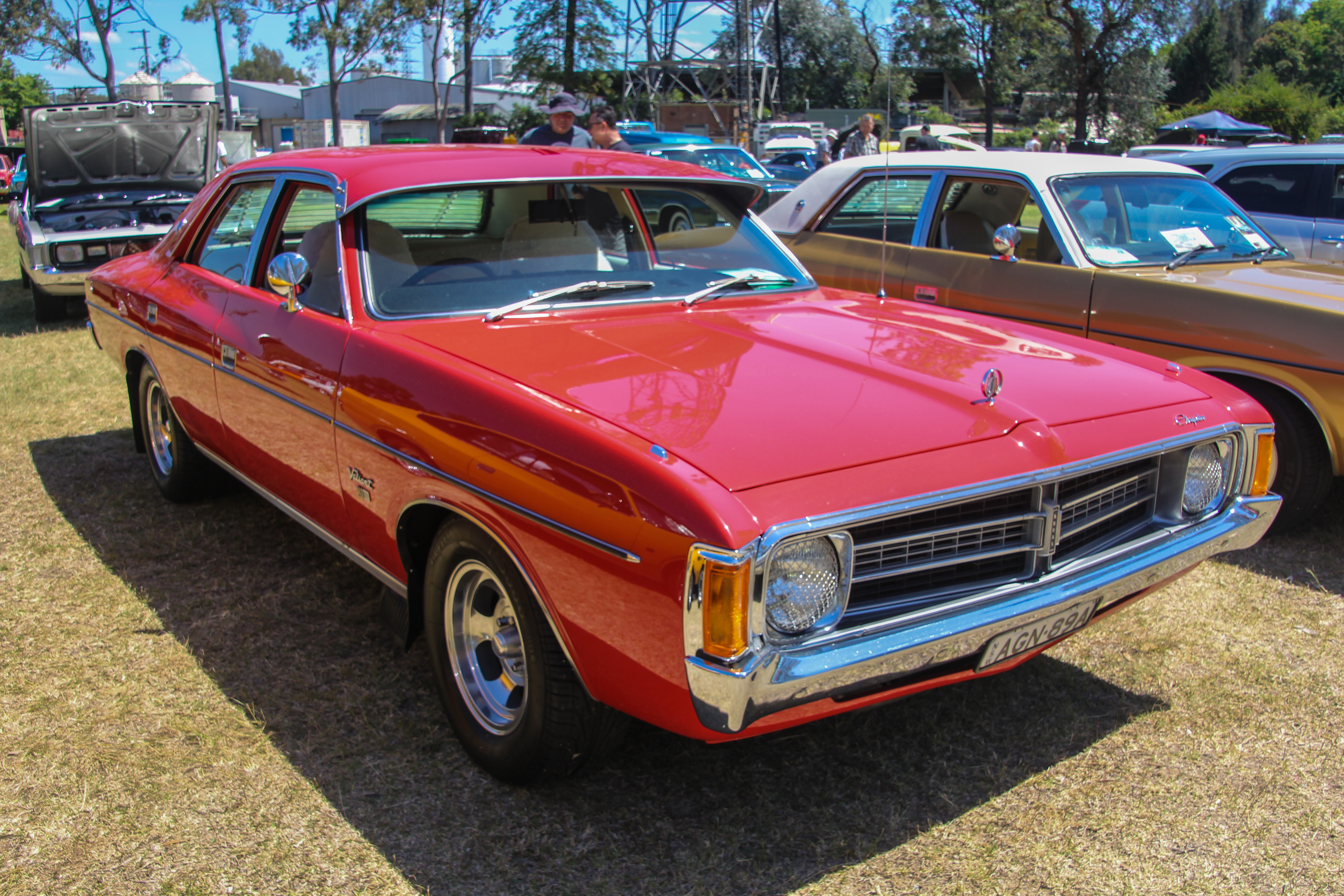
Chrysler VK Valiant Regal sedan

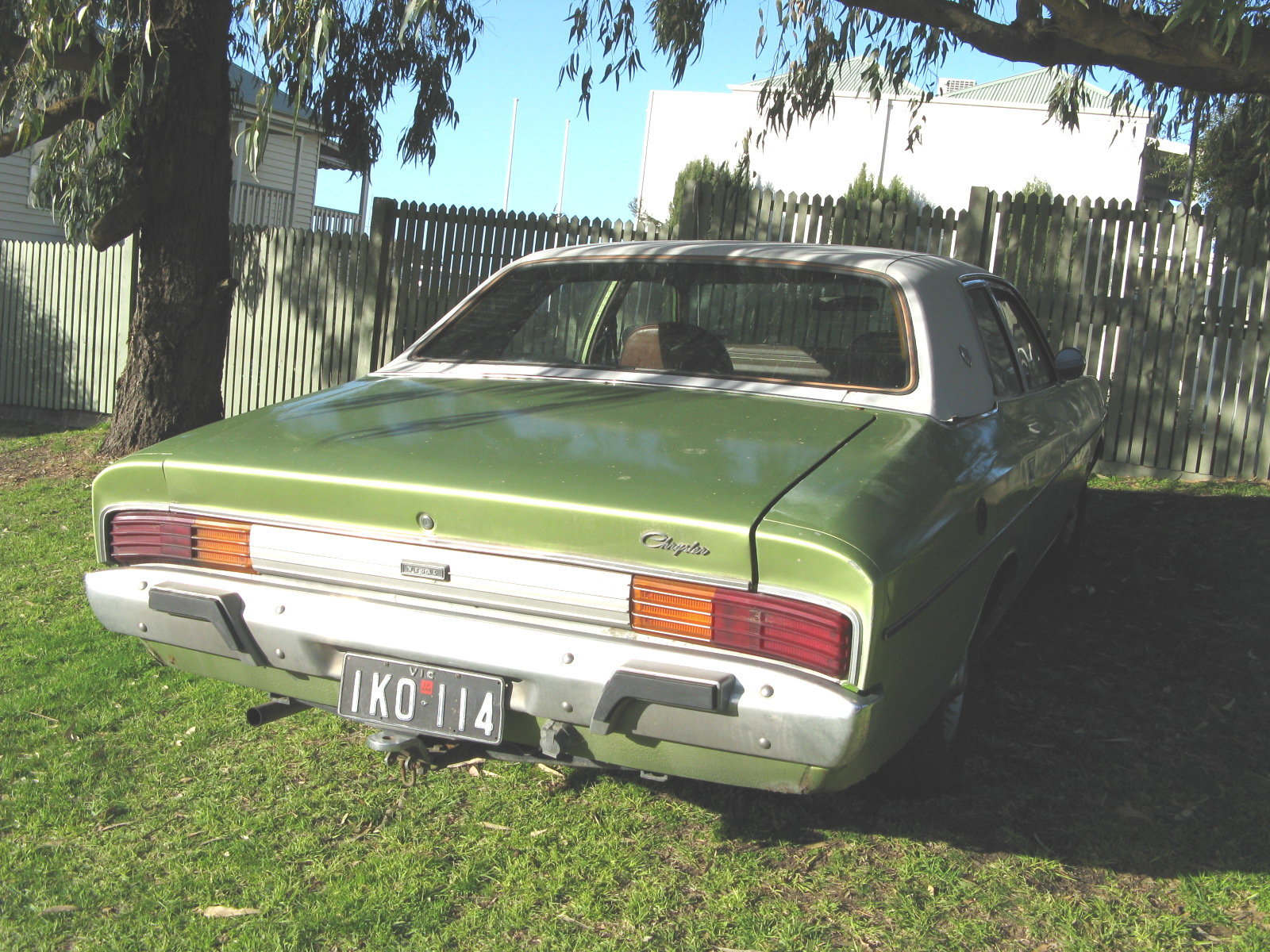
Chrysler VK Valiant Regal sedan

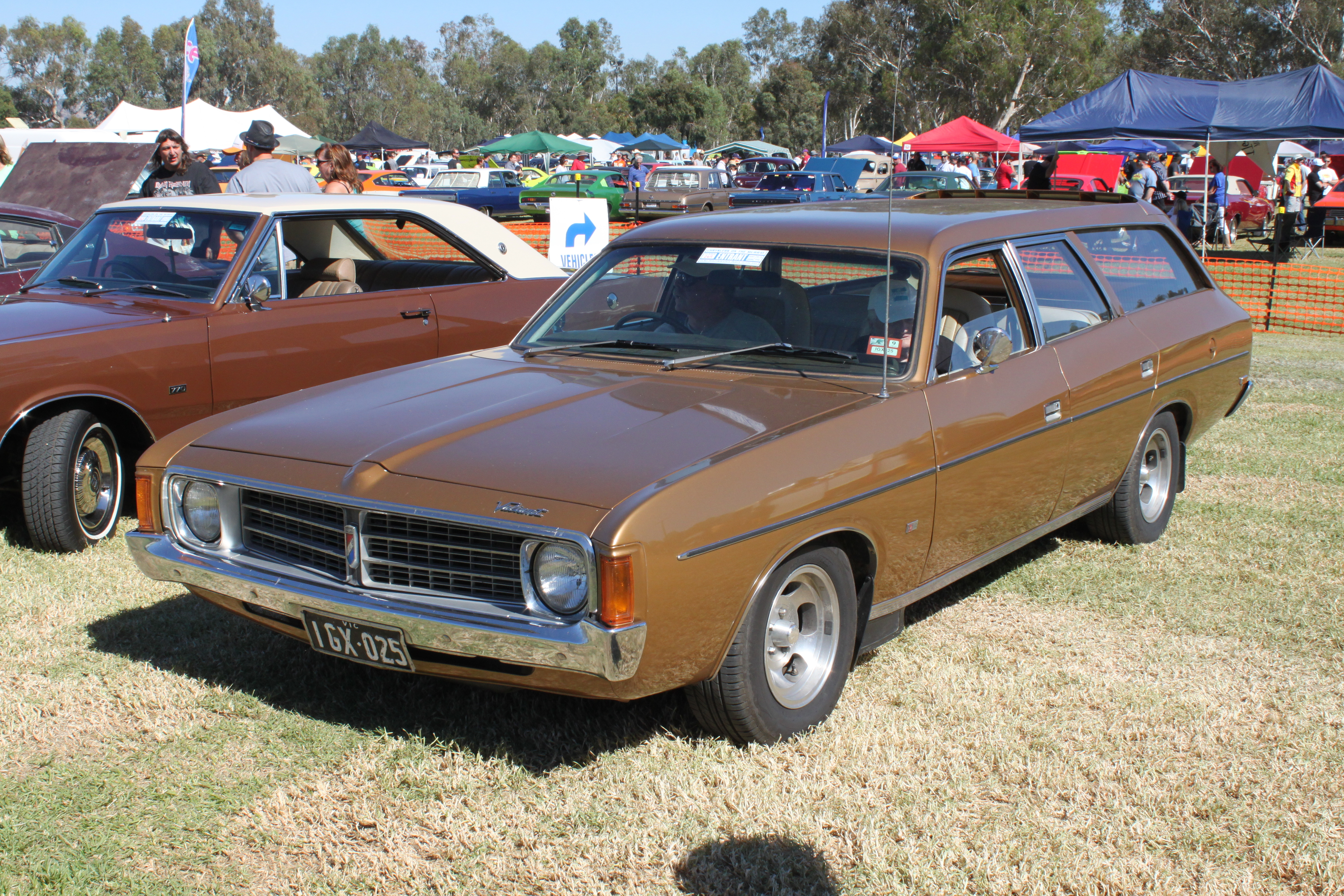
Chrysler VK Valiant Regal wagon

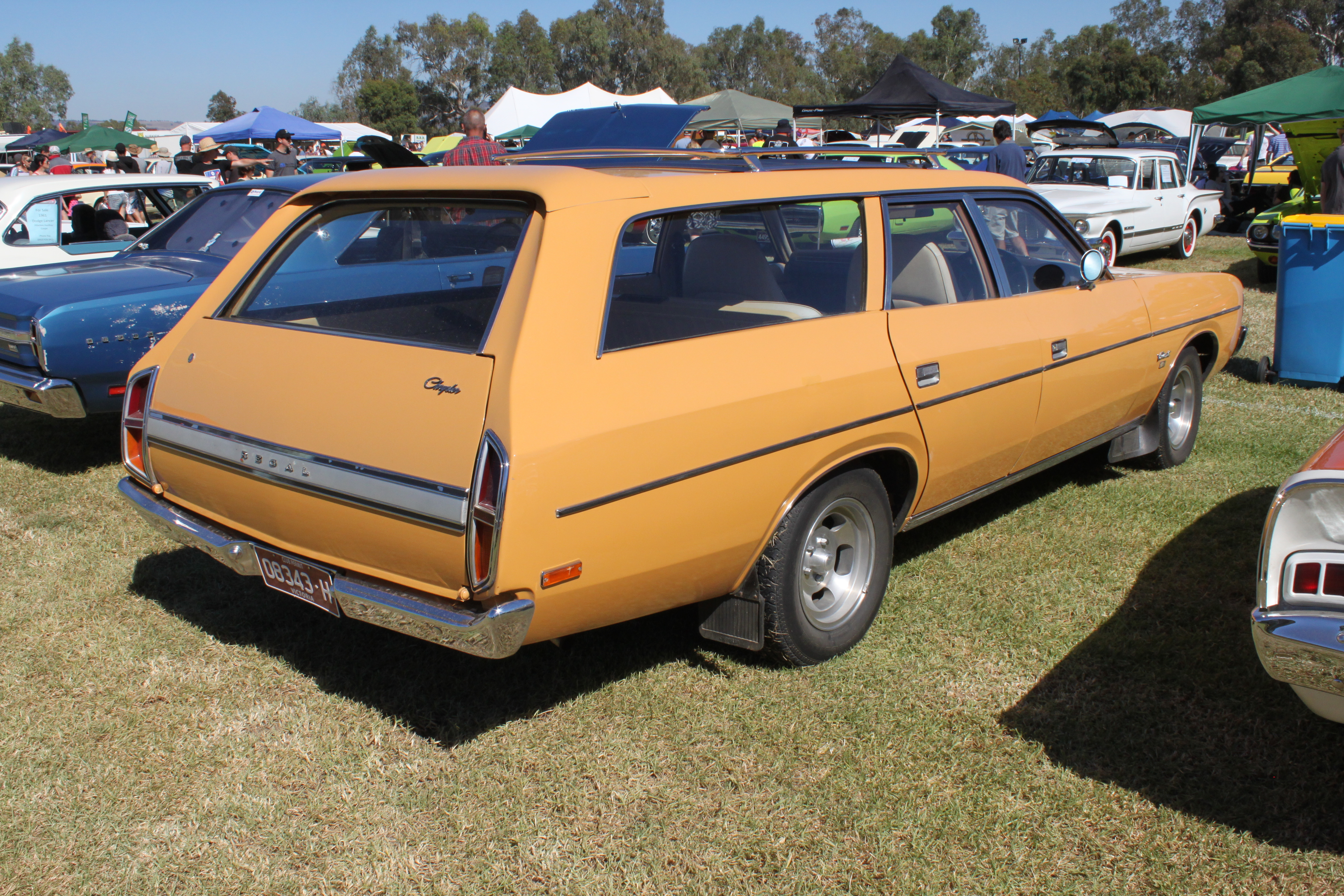
Chrysler VK Valiant Regal wagon

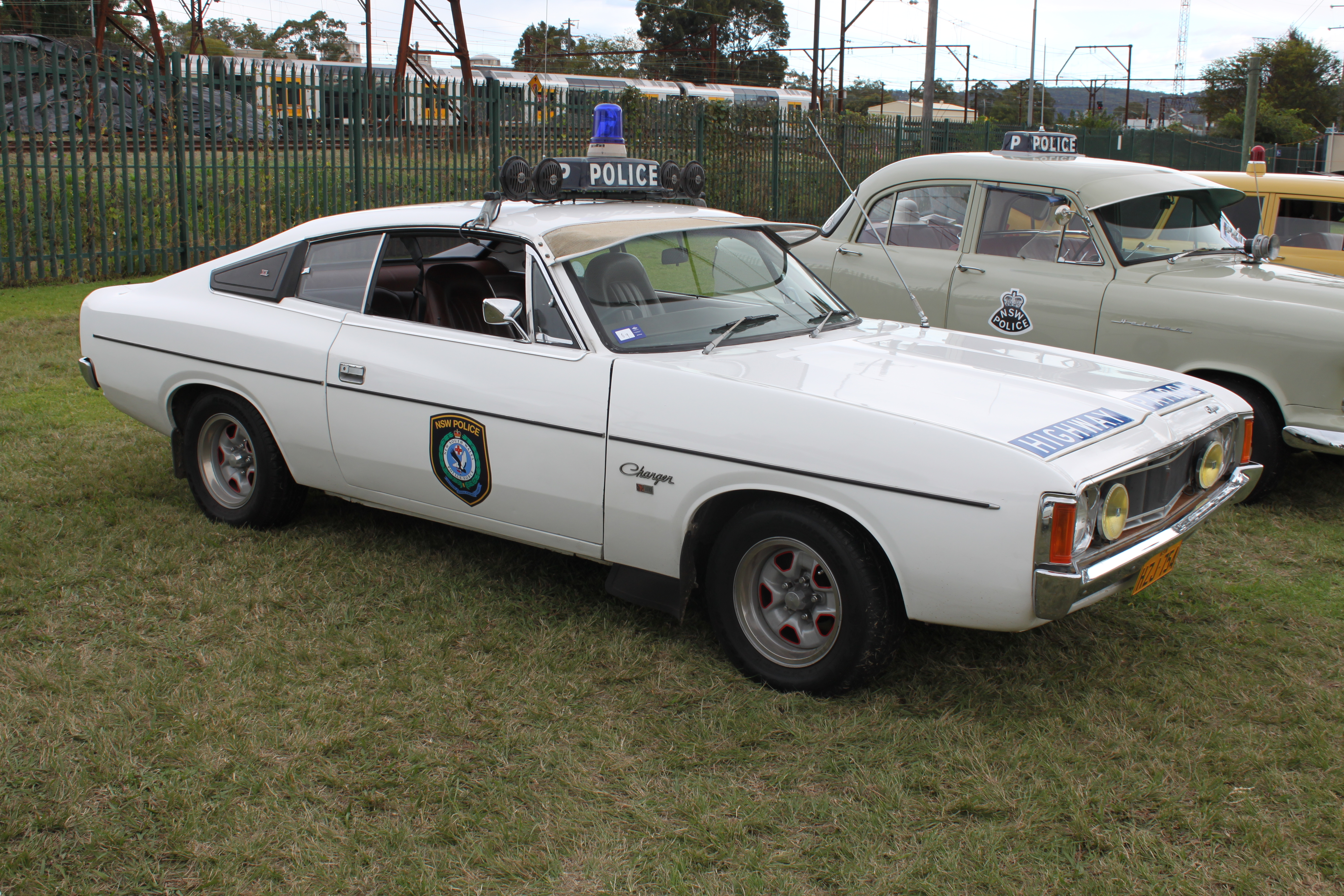
Chrysler VK Charger XL coupe

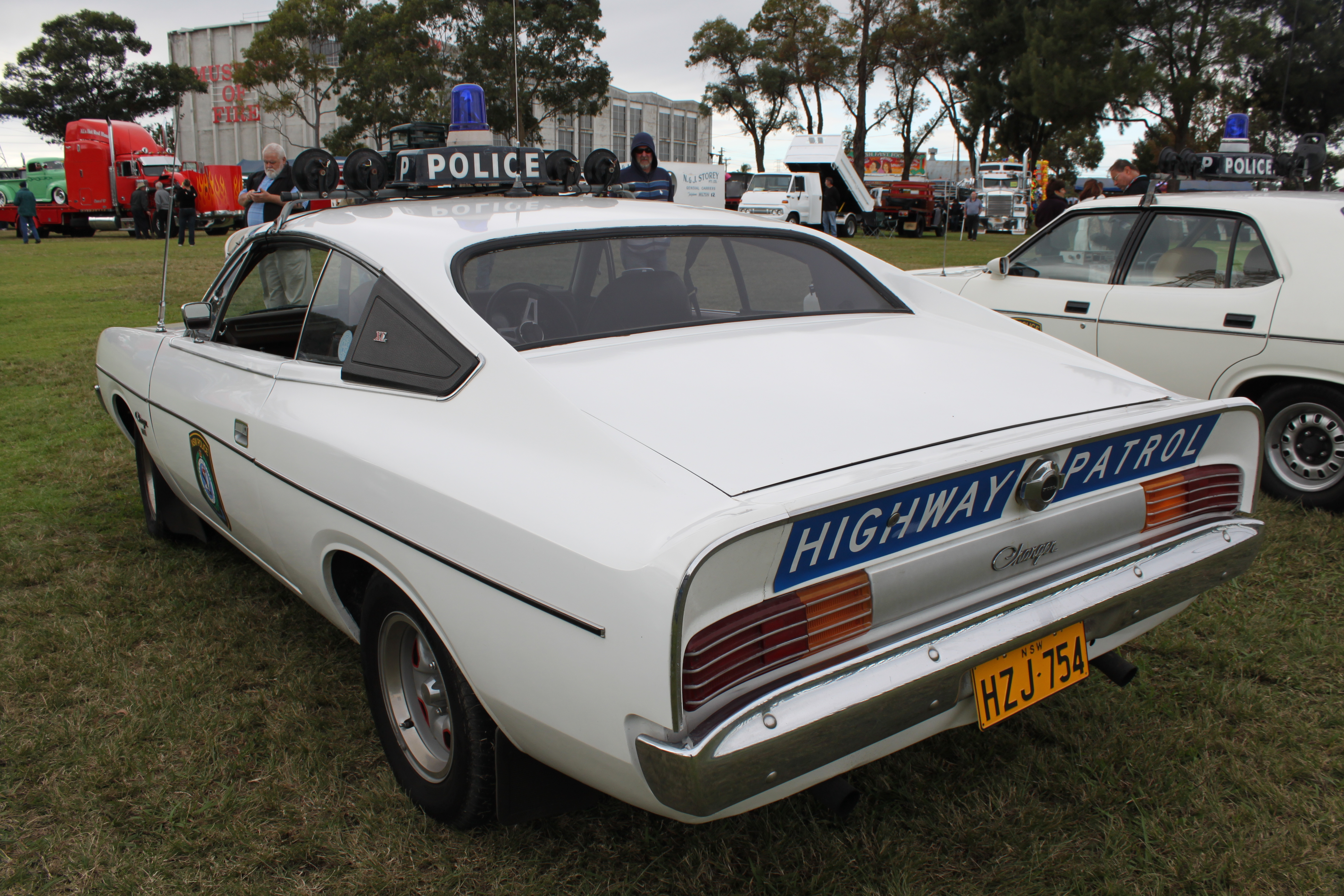
Chrysler VK Charger XL coupe

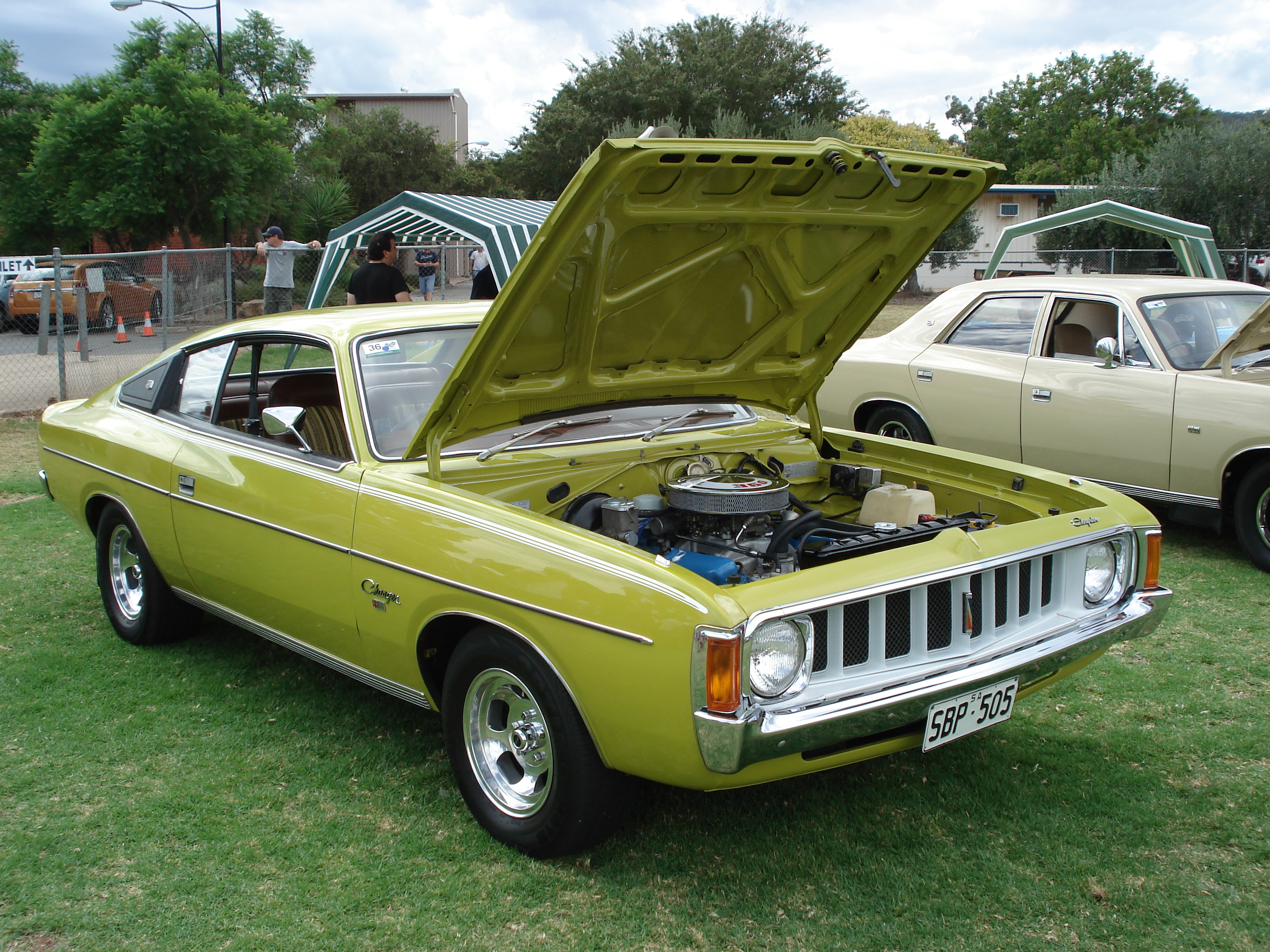
Chrysler VK Charger 770 coupe

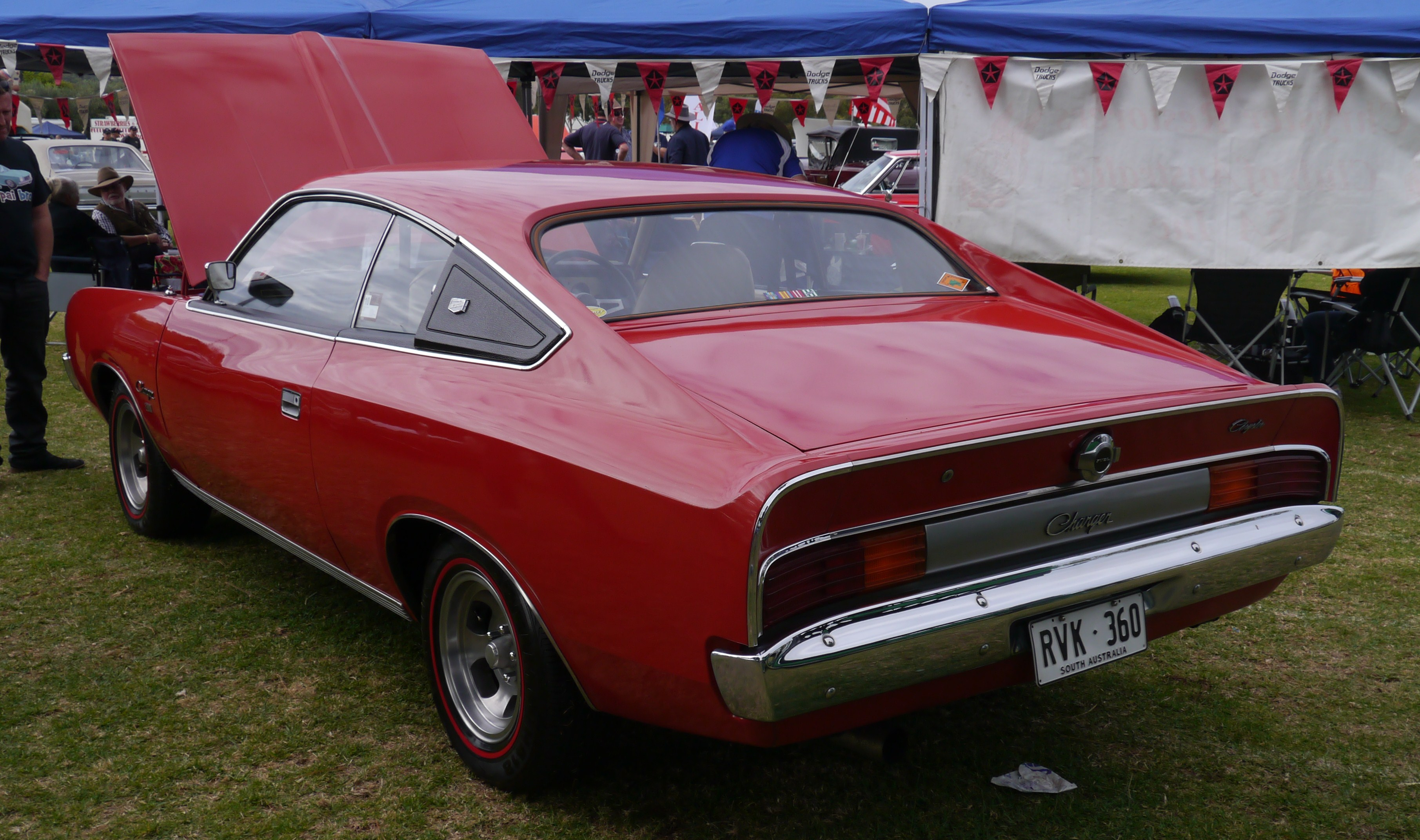
Chrysler VK Charger 770 coupe

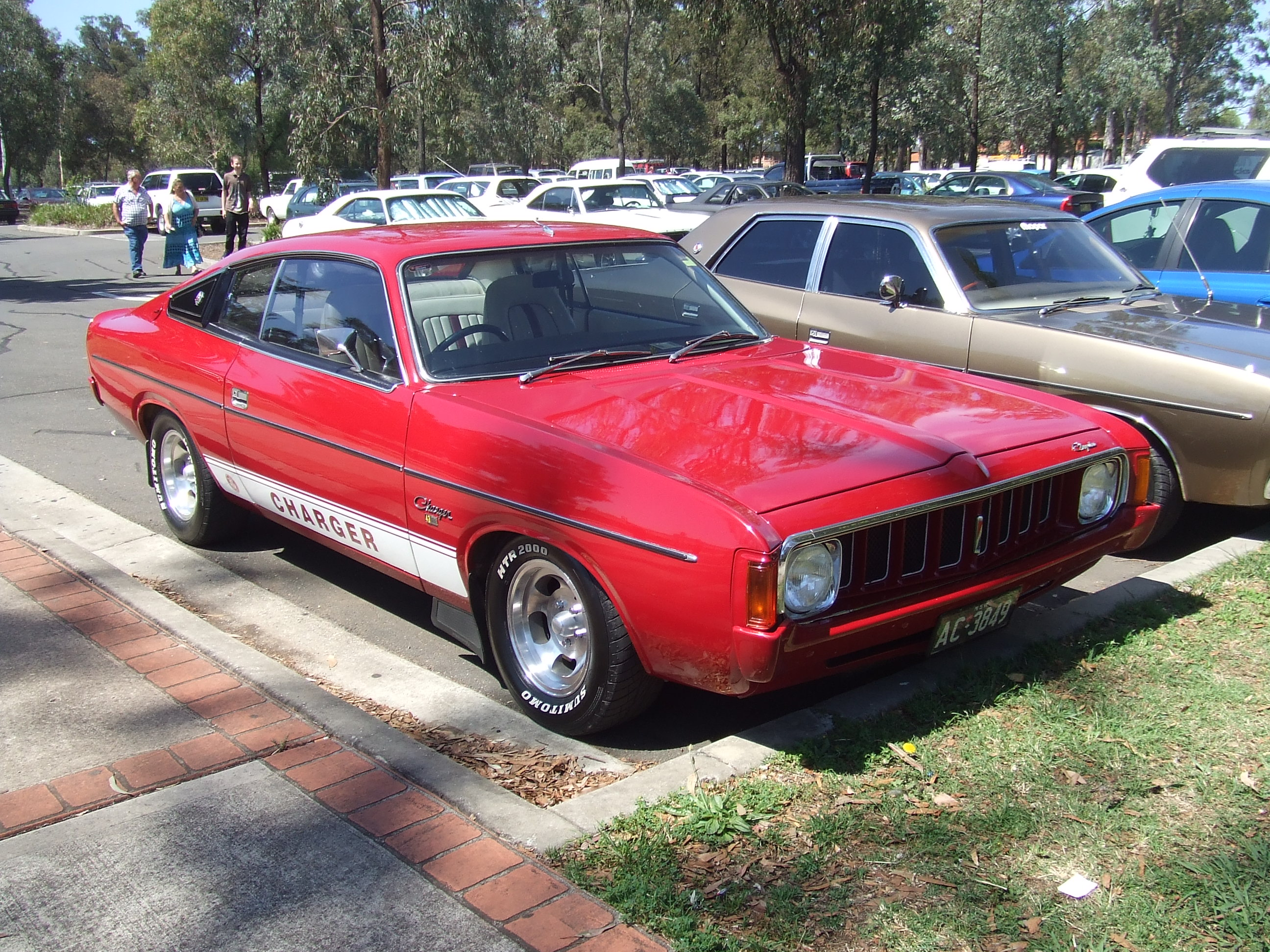
Chrysler VK Charger White Knight Special coupe in Amarante Red

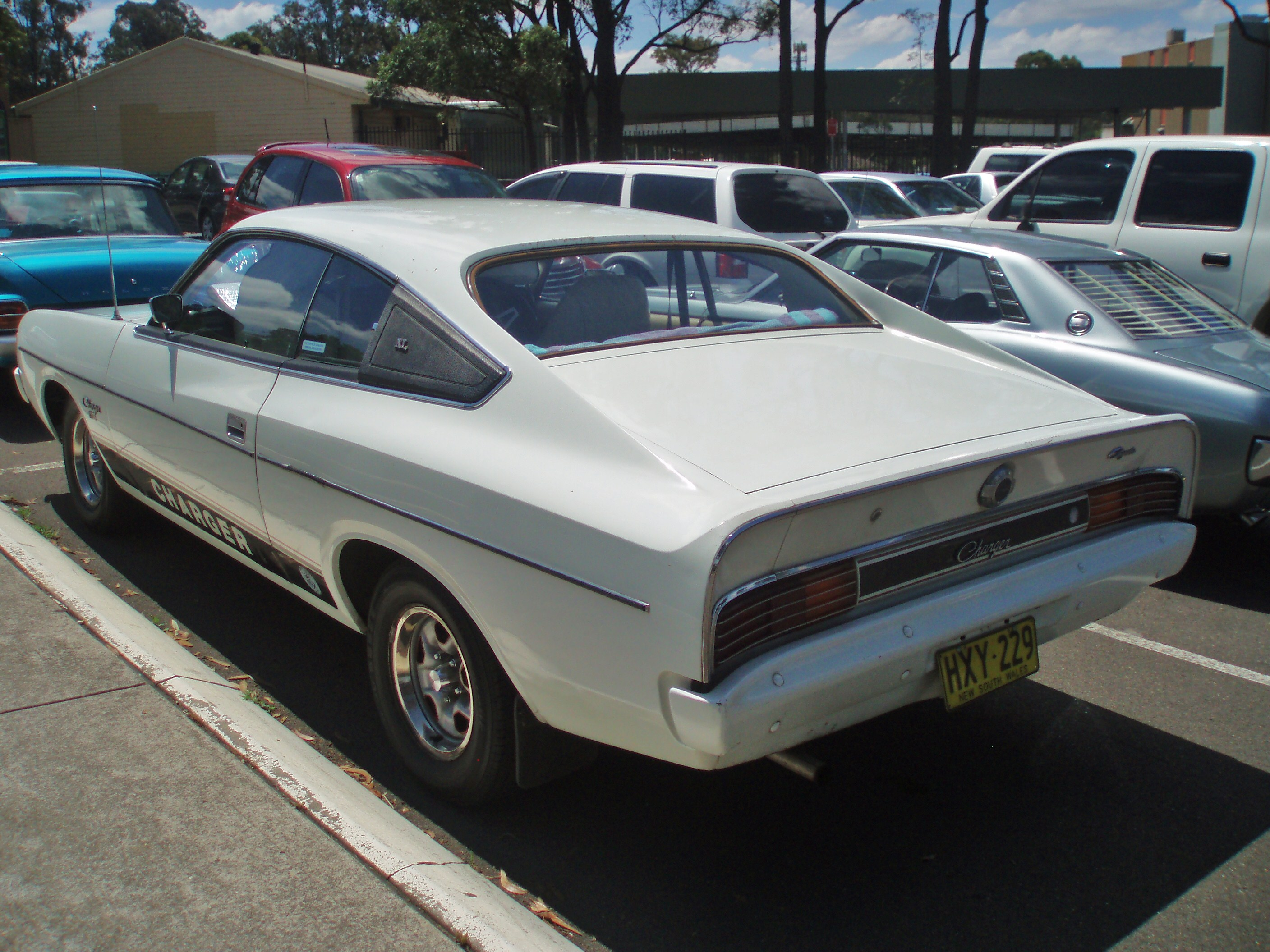
Chrysler VK Charger White Knight Special coupe in Arctic White

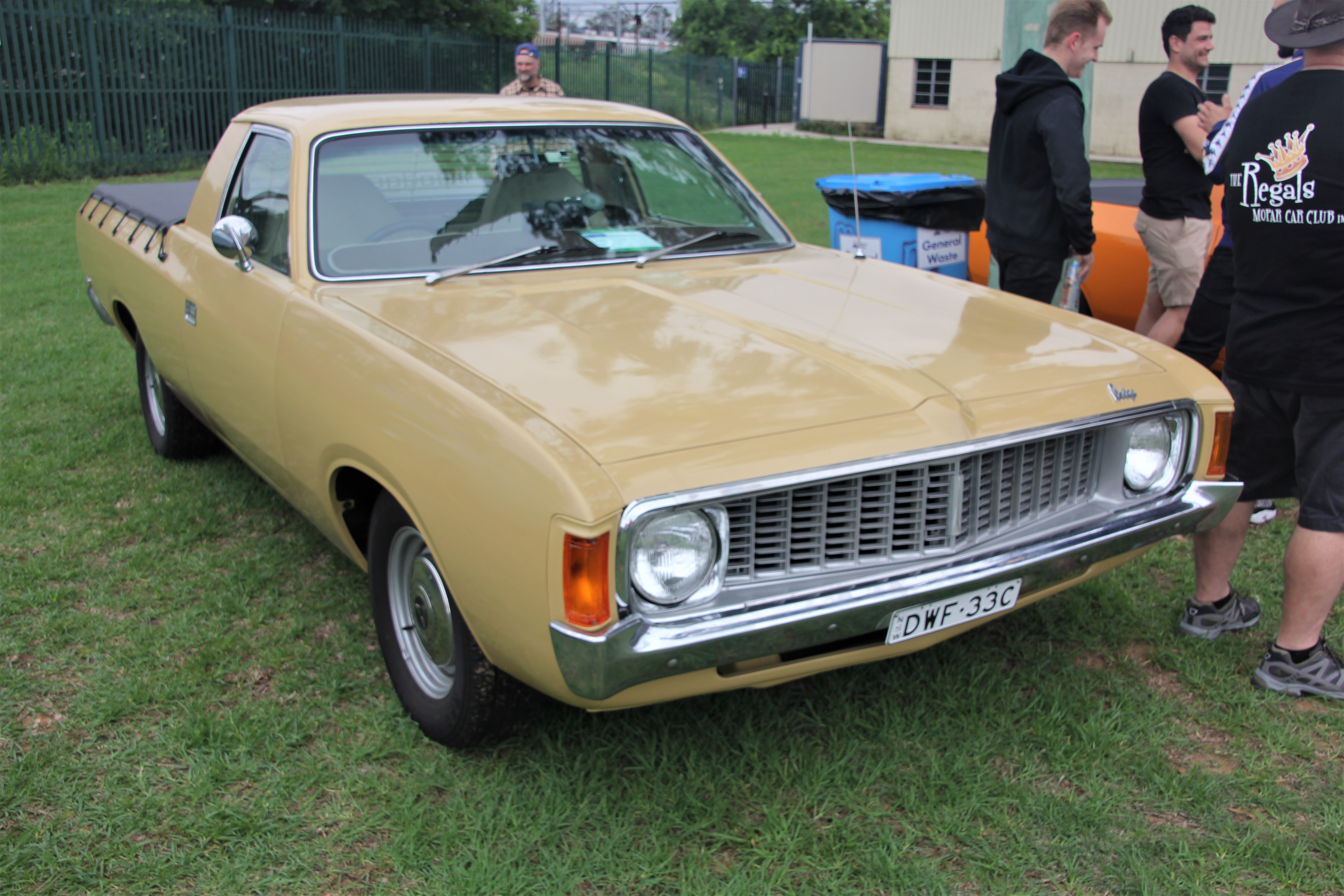
Dodge VK utility

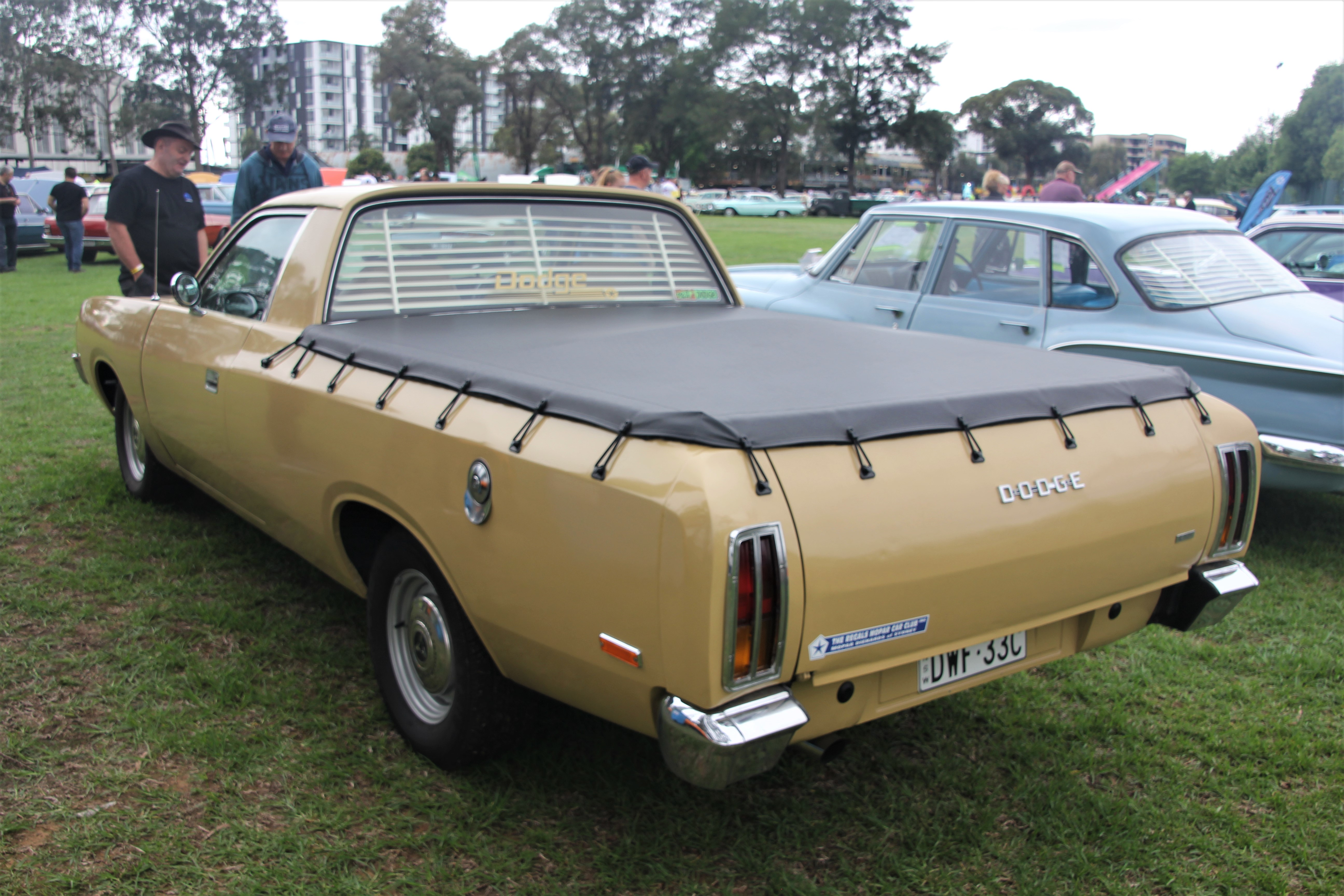
Dodge VK utility

== Engines and transmissions ==
The range of engines available in the VK series comprised 215 cu in (3.5 L) I6, 245 cu in (4.0 L) I6, 265 cu in (4.3 L) I6, 318 cu in (5.2 L) V8 and 360 cu in (5.9 L) V8. 3 speed manual, 4 speed manual and 3 speed automatic transmissions were offered.

As of July 1976, the 215 and 360 engines were dropped from the lineup, to conform with ADR27A emissions requirements. The 215 was replaced by a low compression version of the 245.

== Production and replacement ==
VK production comprised 11,722 sedans, 4,039 wagons, 1,625 Chargers and 3,169 utilities for a total of 20,555 units. This was the lowest Valiant production since the S Series. The VK was superseded by the Chrysler Valiant (CL) in November 1976.

== Chrysler CK series ==
Chrysler Australia also produced the related Chrysler CK series, a long wheelbase, luxury model developed from the Valiant VK. In July 1976, the 360 (5.9L) engine was dropped to meet ADR27A emissions requirements, being replaced by the 318 (5.2L) engine as standard fitment to the Chrysler, which gained colour coded hubcaps and Cloth Cord trim at the same time. The Chrysler CK was replaced by the Chrysler Regal SE in October 1976, the later being the prestige model in the newly released Chrysler Valiant (CL) range.

== See also ==
- Chrysler Valiant
- Chrysler Valiant Charger
