= Chrysler Valiant (VJ) =

Australian full-size car

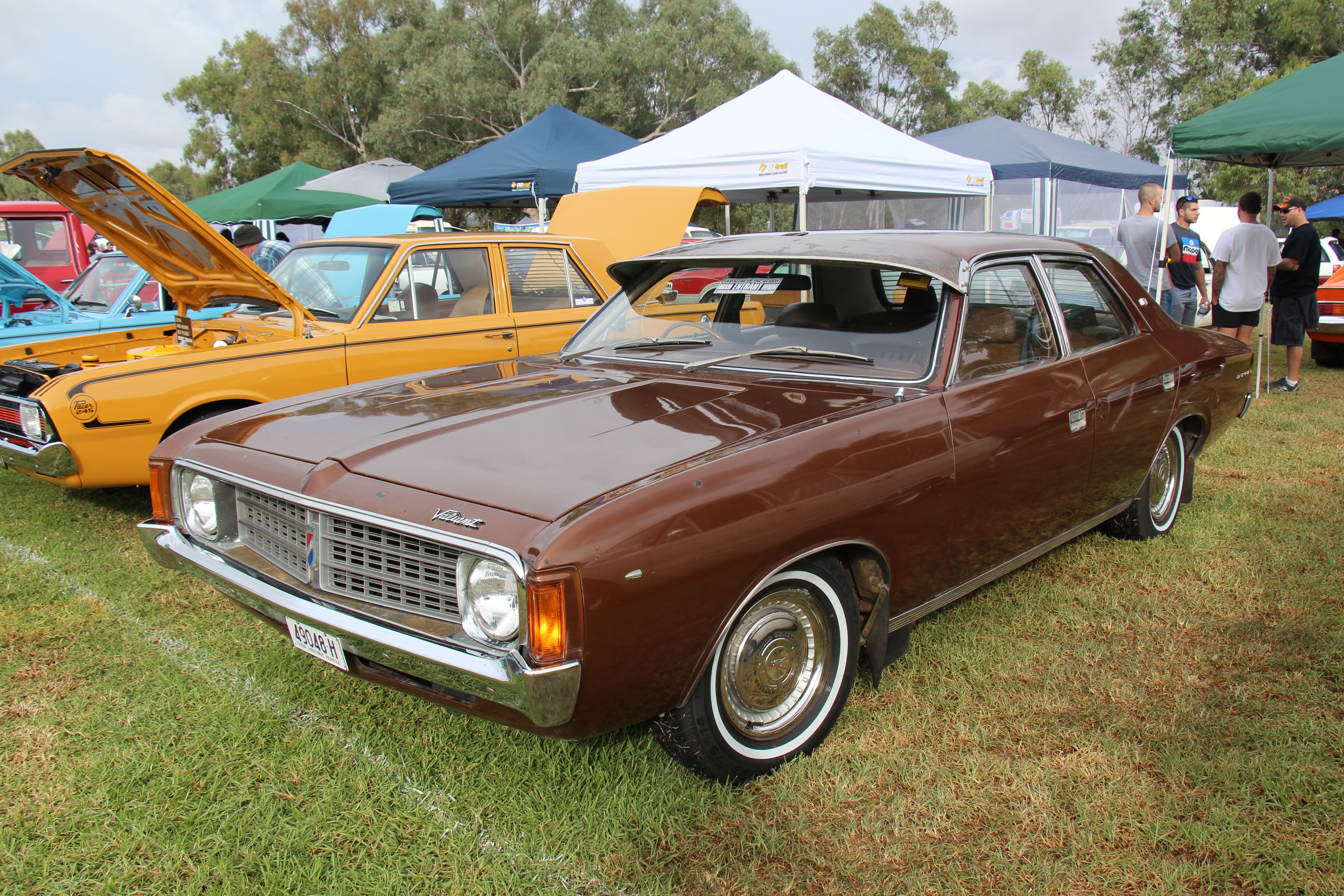
- Chrysler VJ Valiant Regal Sedan

Overview
- Manufacturer: Chrysler Australia
- Also called: Dodge Utility
- Production: April 1973 – September 1975
- Assembly: Australia: Tonsley Park; New Zealand: Petone; New Zealand: Porirua; South Africa: Pretoria

Body and chassis
- Body style: 4-door sedan 5-door station wagon 2-door hardtop 2-door coupé 2-door coupé utility
- Layout: FR layout
- Related: Chrysler by Chrysler (CJ series)

Powertrain
- Engine: 215 cu in (3.5 L) I6; 245 cu in (4.0 L) I6; 265 cu in (4.3 L) I6; 318 cu in (5.2 L) V8; 340 cu in (5.6 L) V8; 360 cu in (5.9 L) V8
- Transmission: 3-speed manual 4-speed manual 3-speed automatic

Dimensions
- Wheelbase: Sedan: 111 inches (2,825 mm); Wagon: 111 inches (2,825 mm); Hardtop: 115 inches (2,925 mm); Charger coupe: 105 in (2,675 mm); Utility: 111 inches (2,825 mm)
- Length: Sedan: 192.8 inches (4,900 mm)
- Width: 74.2 inches (1,880 mm)
- Kerb weight: Hemi 6 Sedan: 3,090 pounds (1,400 kg)

Chronology
- Predecessor: Chrysler VH Valiant
- Successor: Chrysler VK Valiant

The Chrysler VJ Valiant is an automobile which was produced by Chrysler Australia from 1973 to 1975. It replaced the Chrysler VH Valiant and was a facelifted and revised version of that model. The VJ series Valiant was the tenth Chrysler Valiant model from Chrysler Australia.

== Overview ==
The VJ Valiant models featured new grilles, round headlights and revised tail lights, along with improved trim and a larger range of colours. A new electronic ignition system was introduced on some models, the first time that this feature had been offered in an Australian built car. The total number of models offered was significantly reduced with Ranger XL, Hemi Pacer, Regal 770 and Charger R/T not carried across from the VH Valiant into the new series. Equipment levels were raised in July 1974 with power assisted front brakes, retractable front safety belts, improved sound deadening, a lockable glovebox and a front stabiliser bar now available on all models other than the utilities.

== Model range ==
The VJ Valiant was introduced in April 1973 and was offered in 4-door sedan, 5-door station wagon, 2-door hardtop, 2-door coupé and 2-door coupé utility body styles in the following models:

- Chrysler Valiant sedan
- Chrysler Valiant Ranger sedan
- Chrysler Valiant Ranger wagon
- Chrysler Valiant Regal sedan
- Chrysler Valiant Regal wagon
- Chrysler Valiant Regal hardtop
- Chrysler Valiant Charger coupe
- Chrysler Valiant Charger XL coupe
- Chrysler Valiant Charger 770 coupe
- Chrysler Valiant utility
- Dodge utility

The Dodge utility was virtually identical to the Chrysler Valiant utility but had a slightly lower level of equipment.

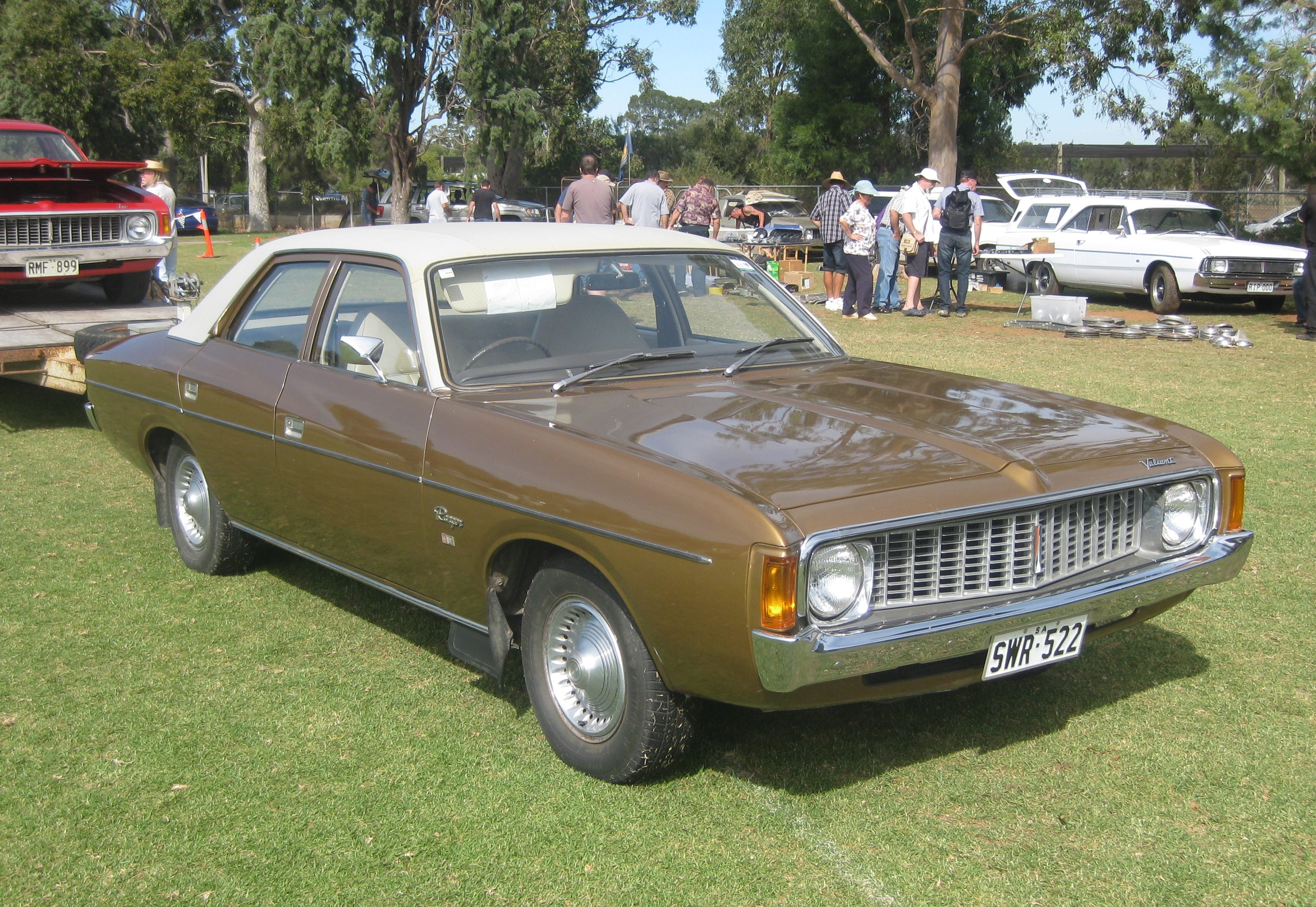
Chrysler VJ Valiant Ranger sedan

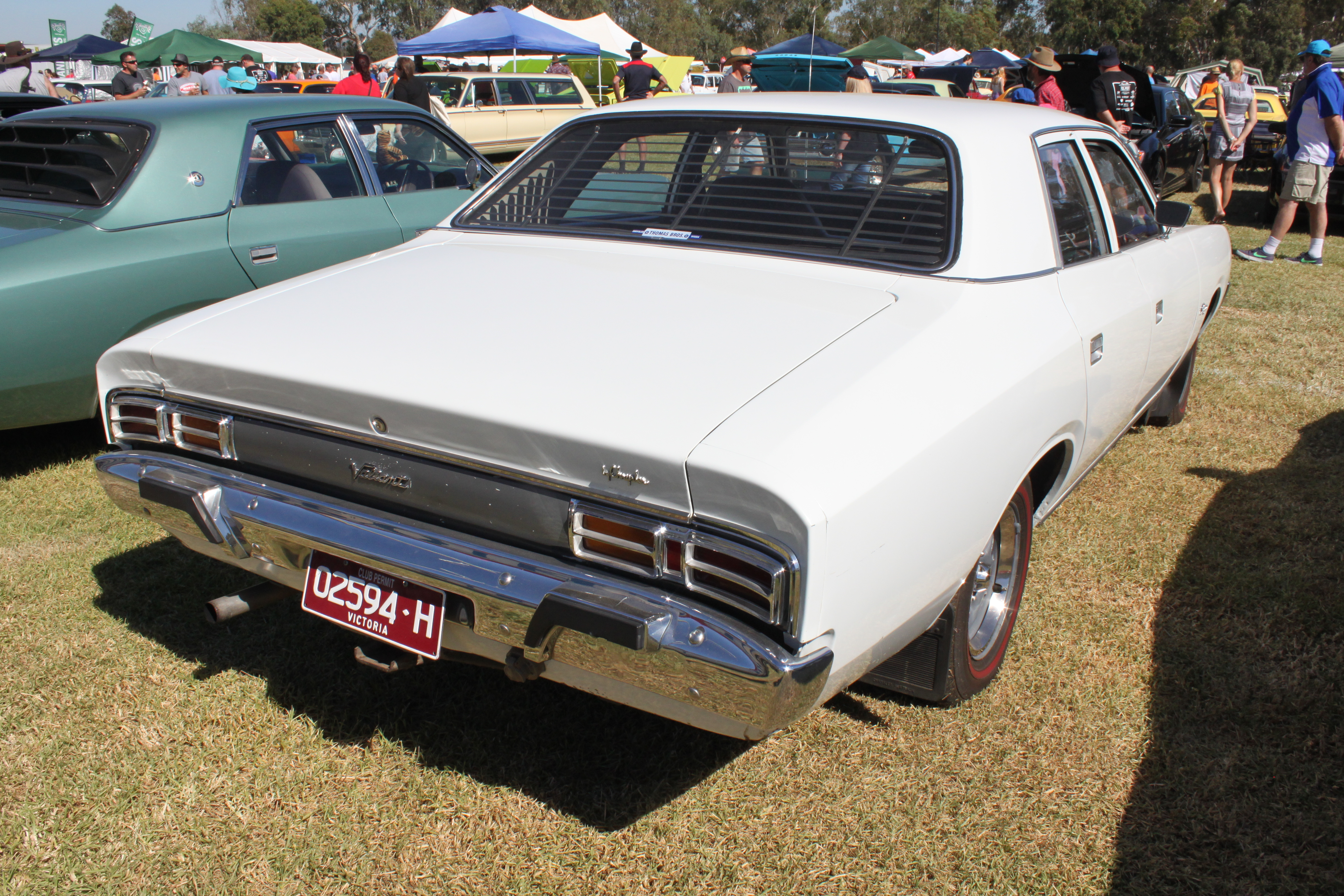
Chrysler VJ Valiant Ranger sedan

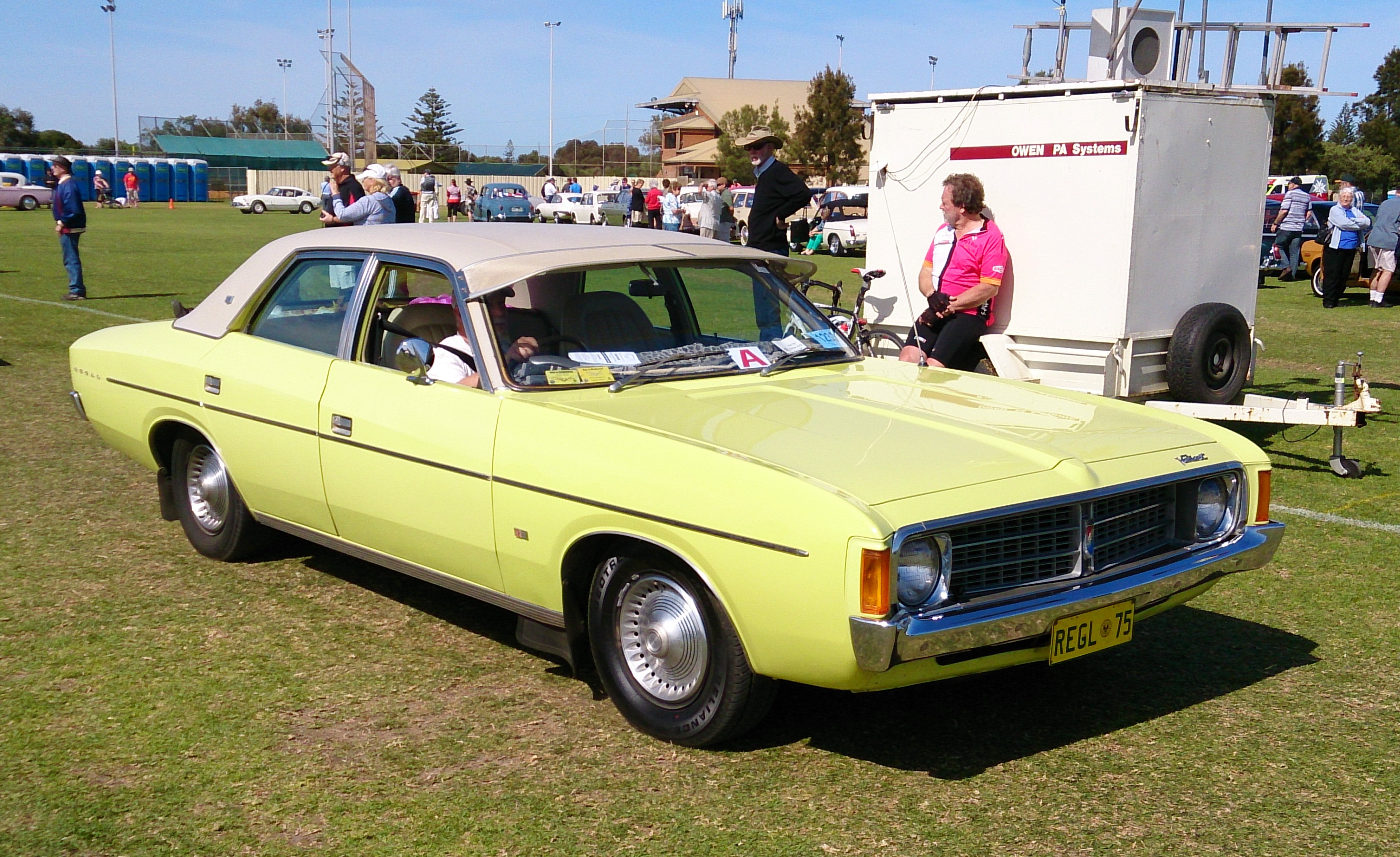
Chrysler VJ Valiant Regal sedan

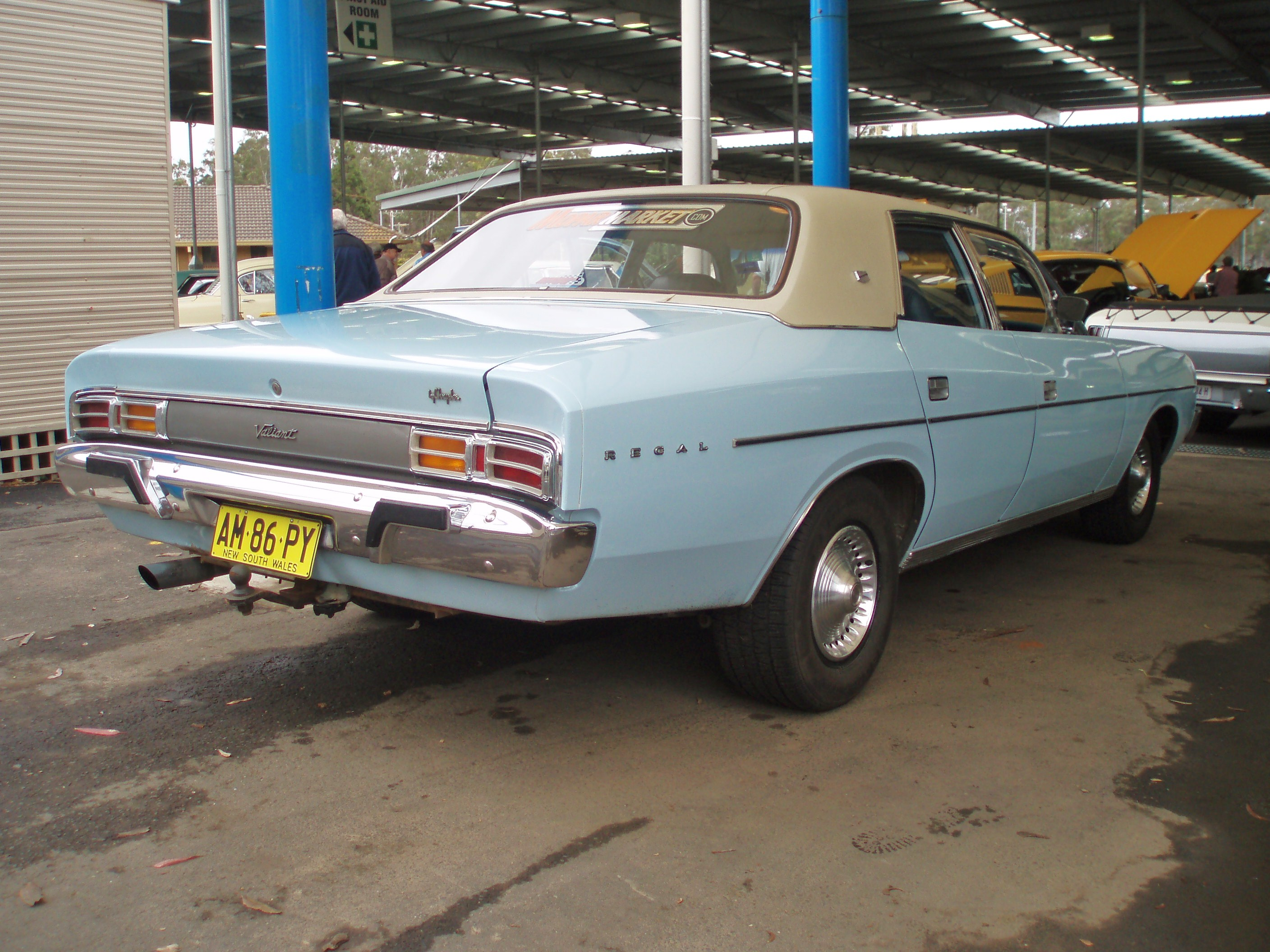
Chrysler VJ Valiant Regal sedan

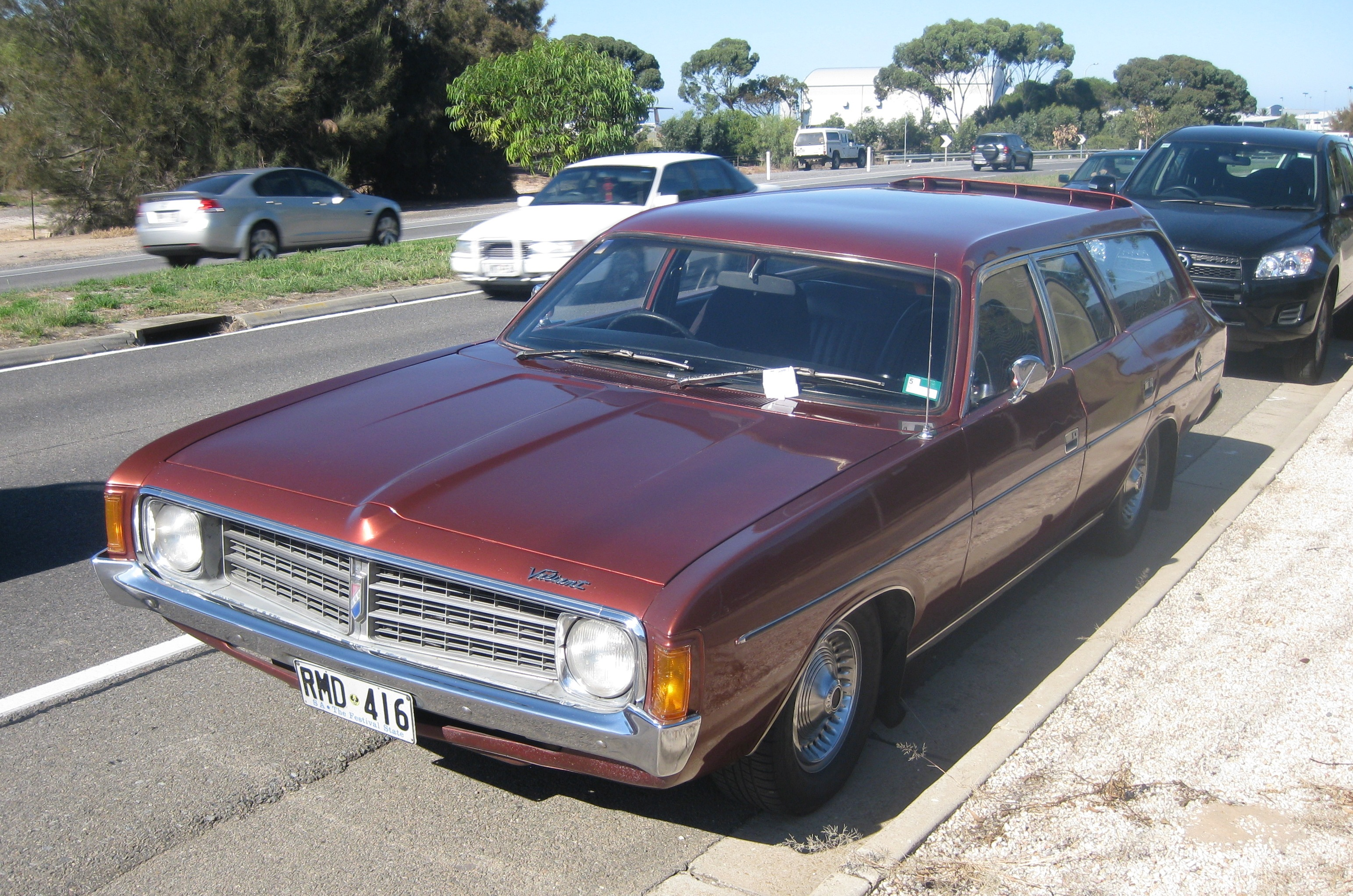
Chrysler VJ Valiant Regal wagon

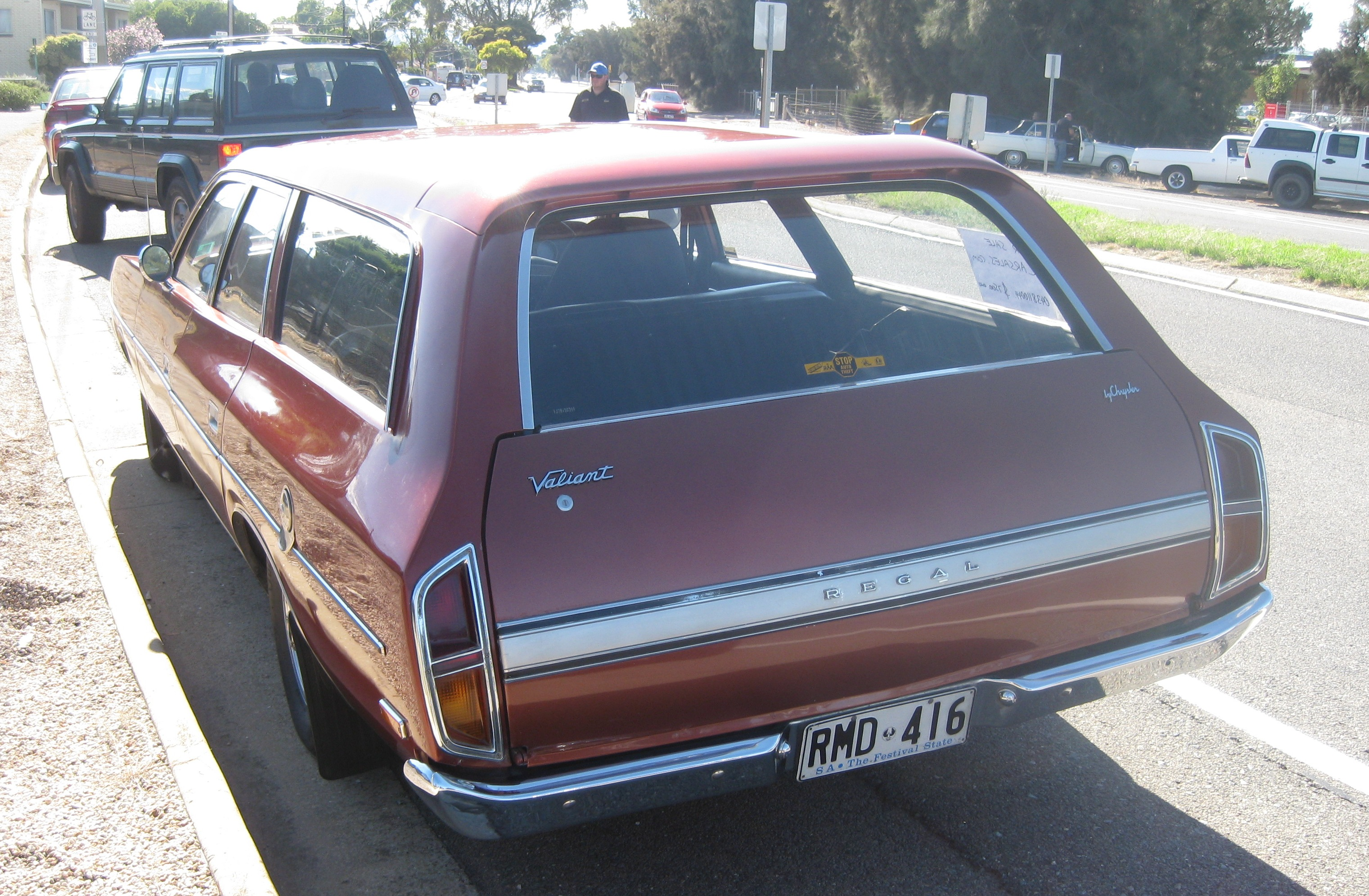
Chrysler VJ Valiant Regal wagon

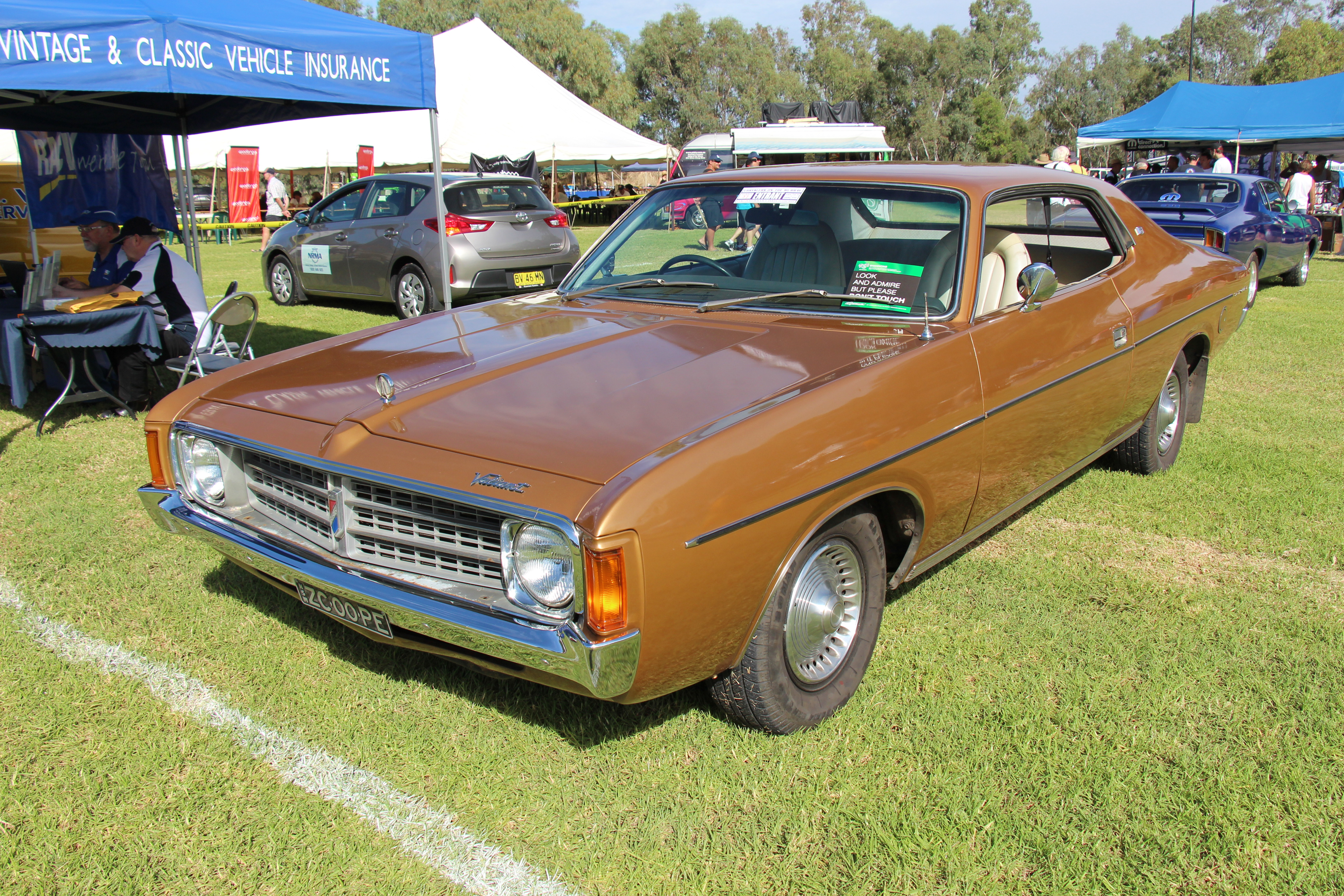
Chrysler VJ Valiant Regal Hardtop

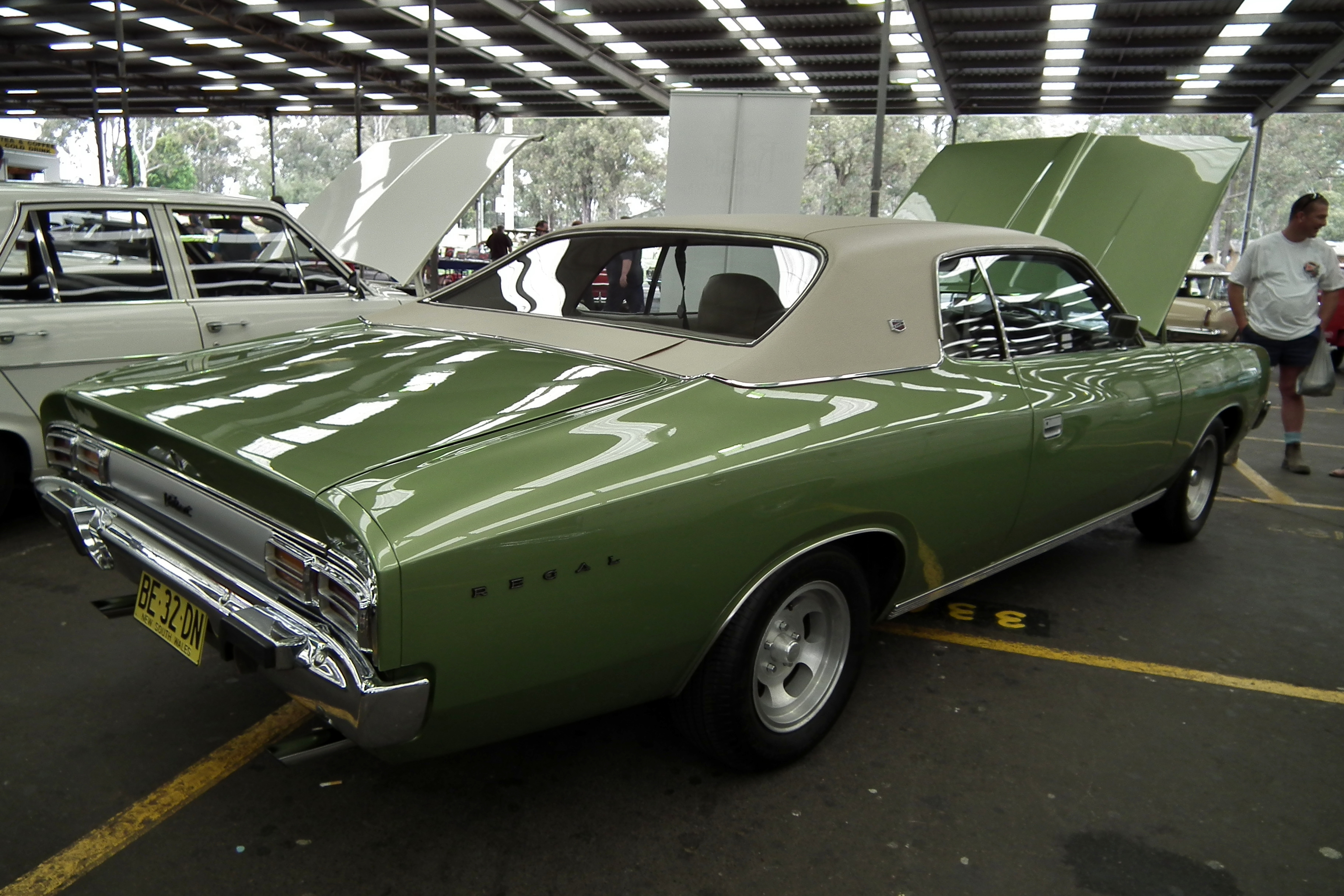
Chrysler VJ Valiant Regal hardtop

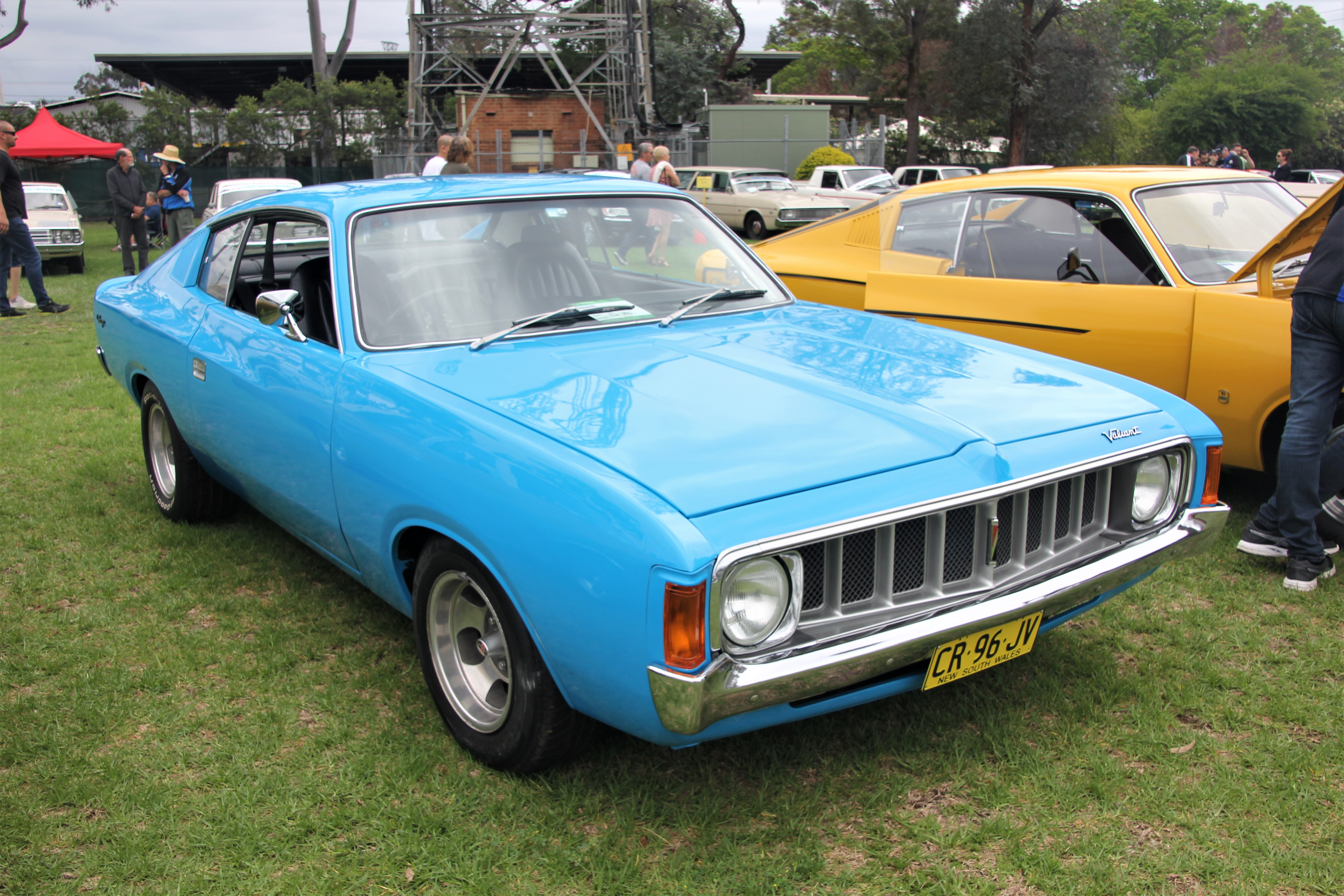
Chrysler VJ Valiant Charger coupe

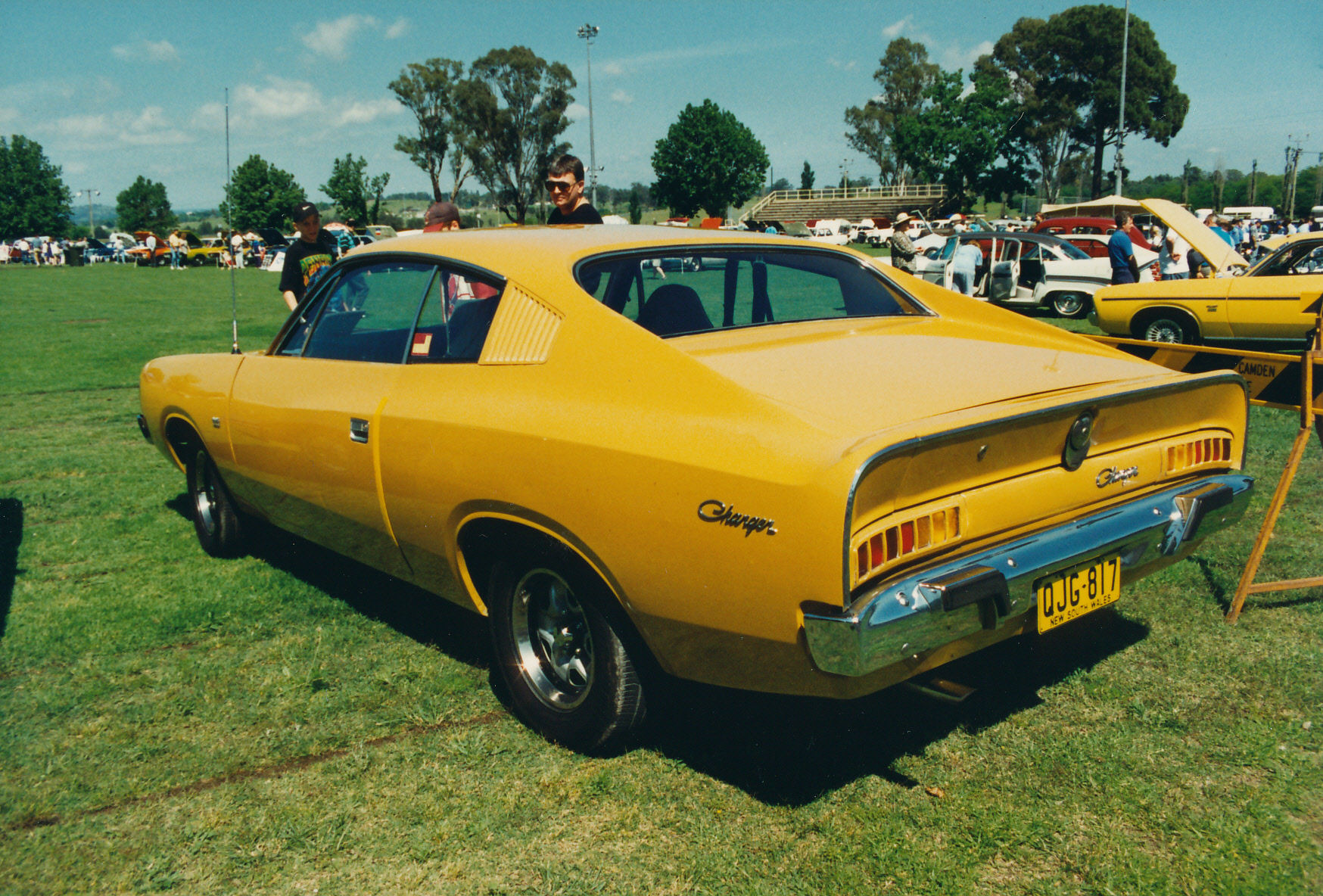
Chrysler VJ Valiant Charger coupe

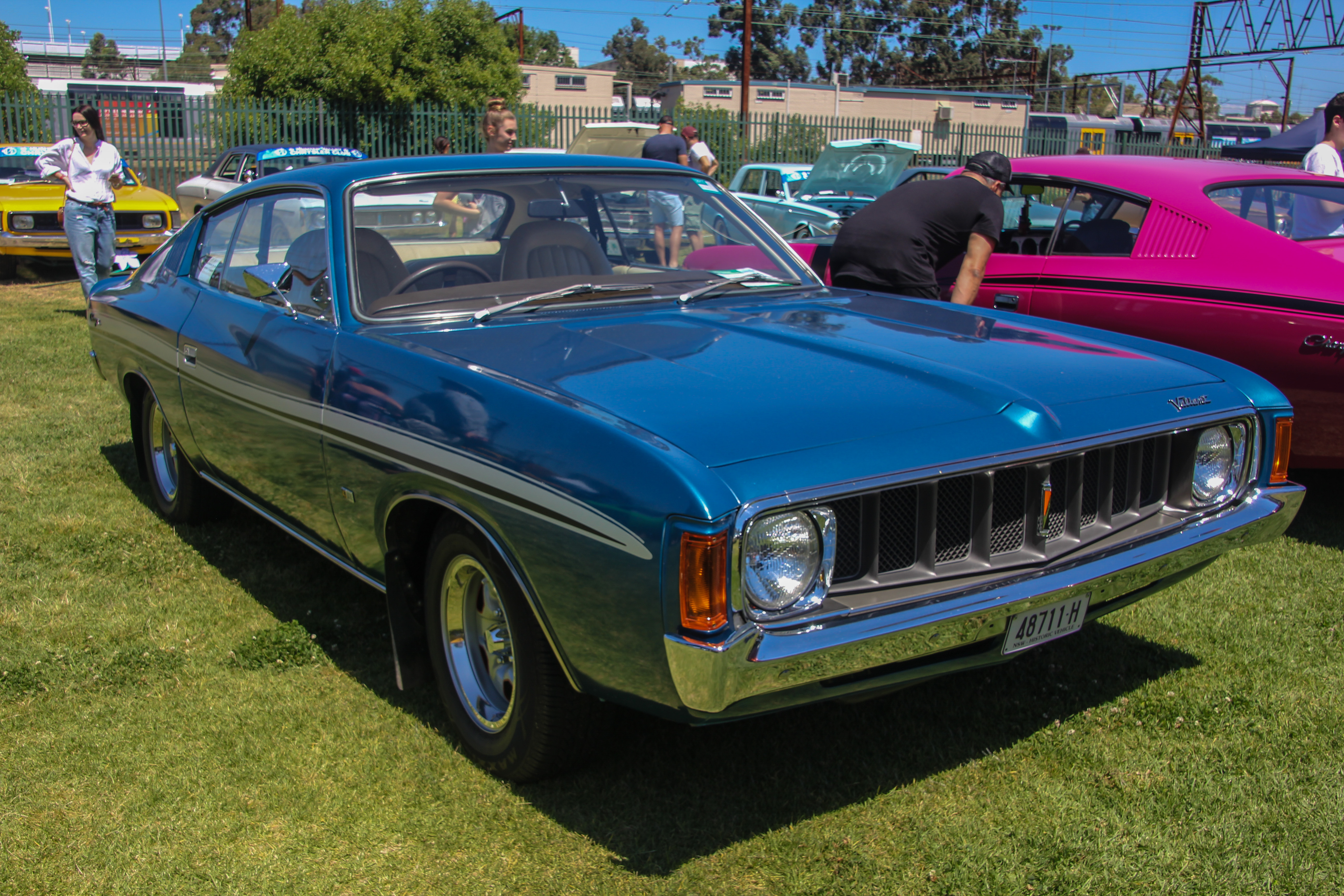
Chrysler VJ Valiant Charger XL coupe with optional Sports Pack

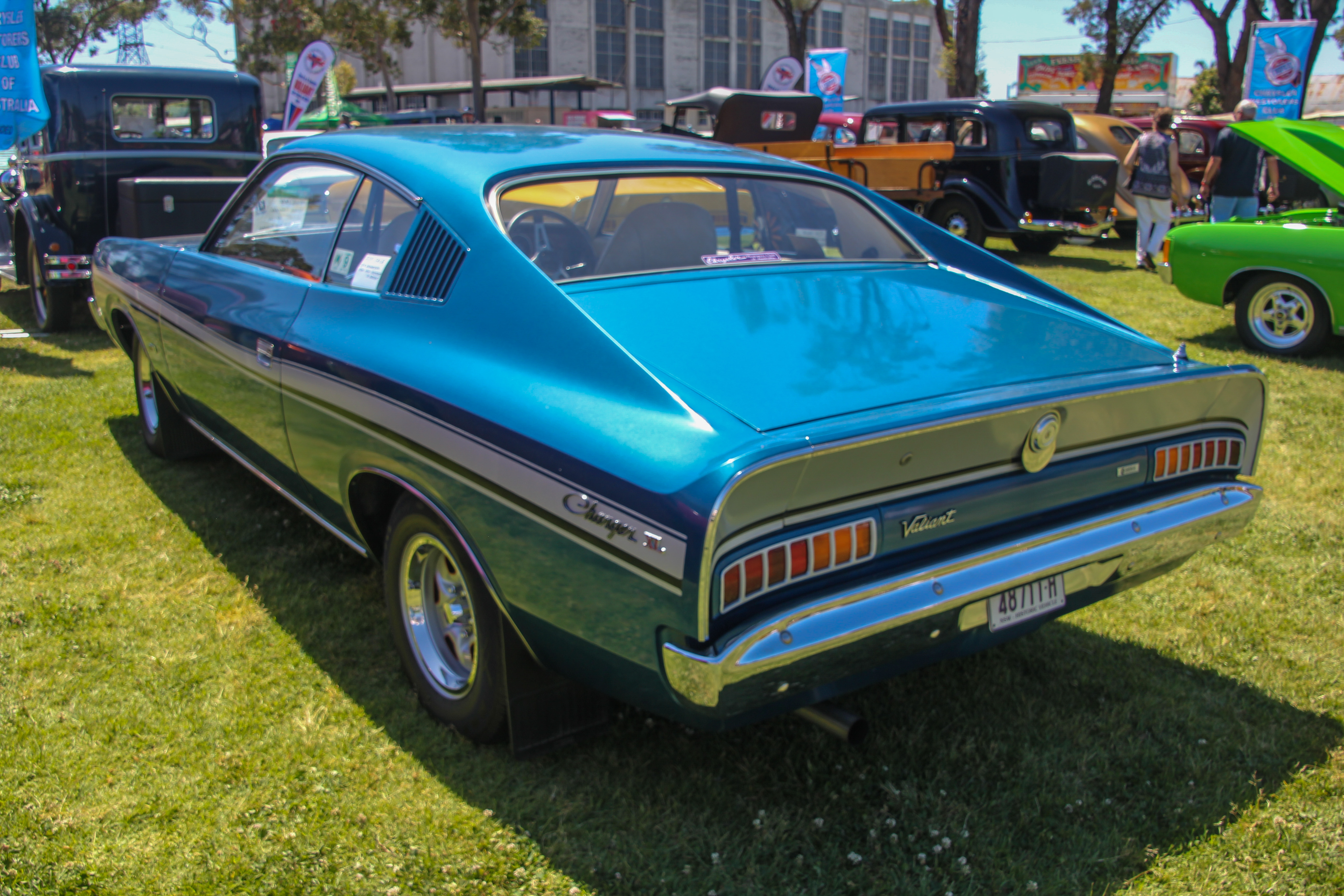
Chrysler VJ Valiant Charger XL coupe with optional Sports Pack

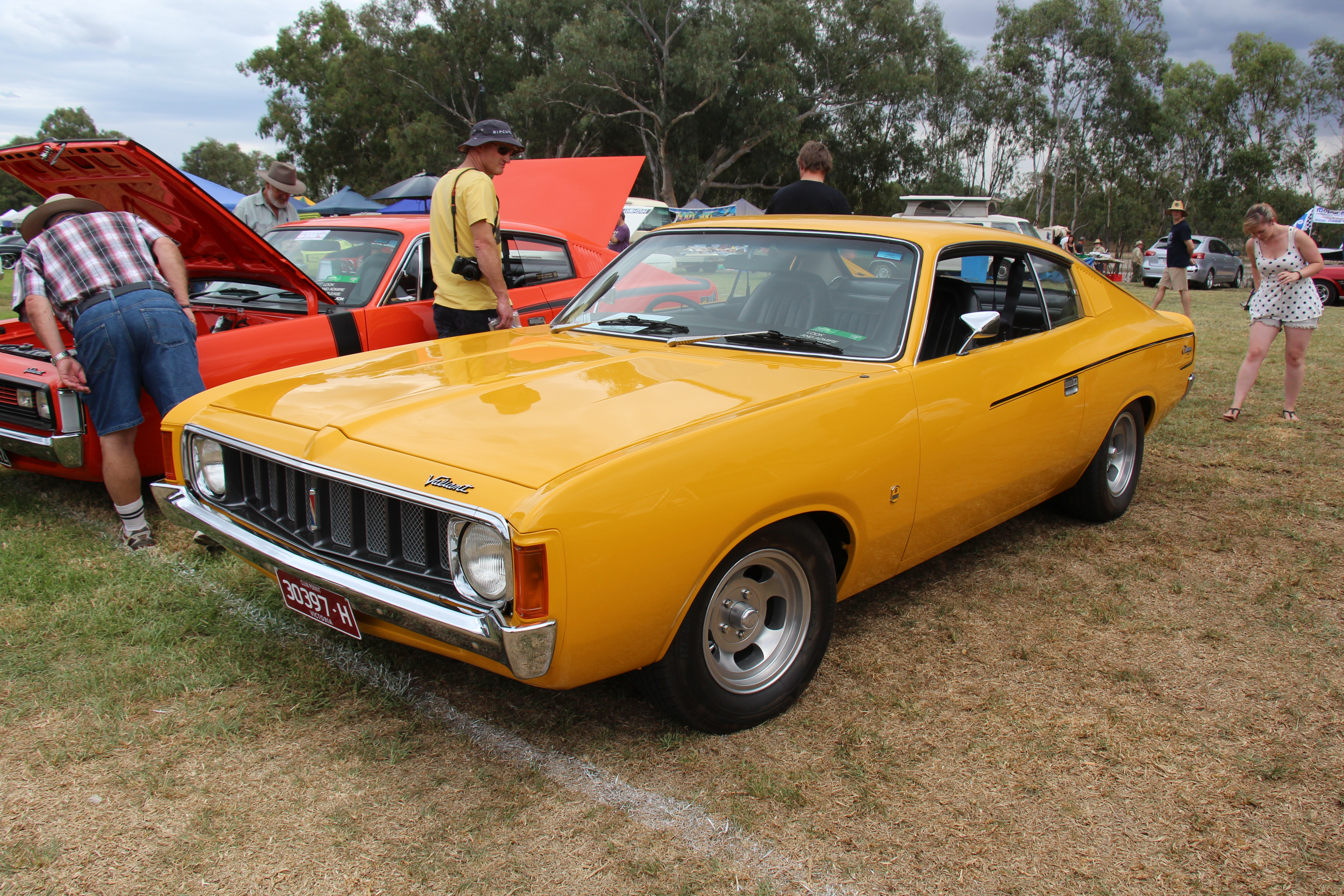
Chrysler VJ Valiant Charger XL (with option E48 265 "six pack" 248 bhp engine)

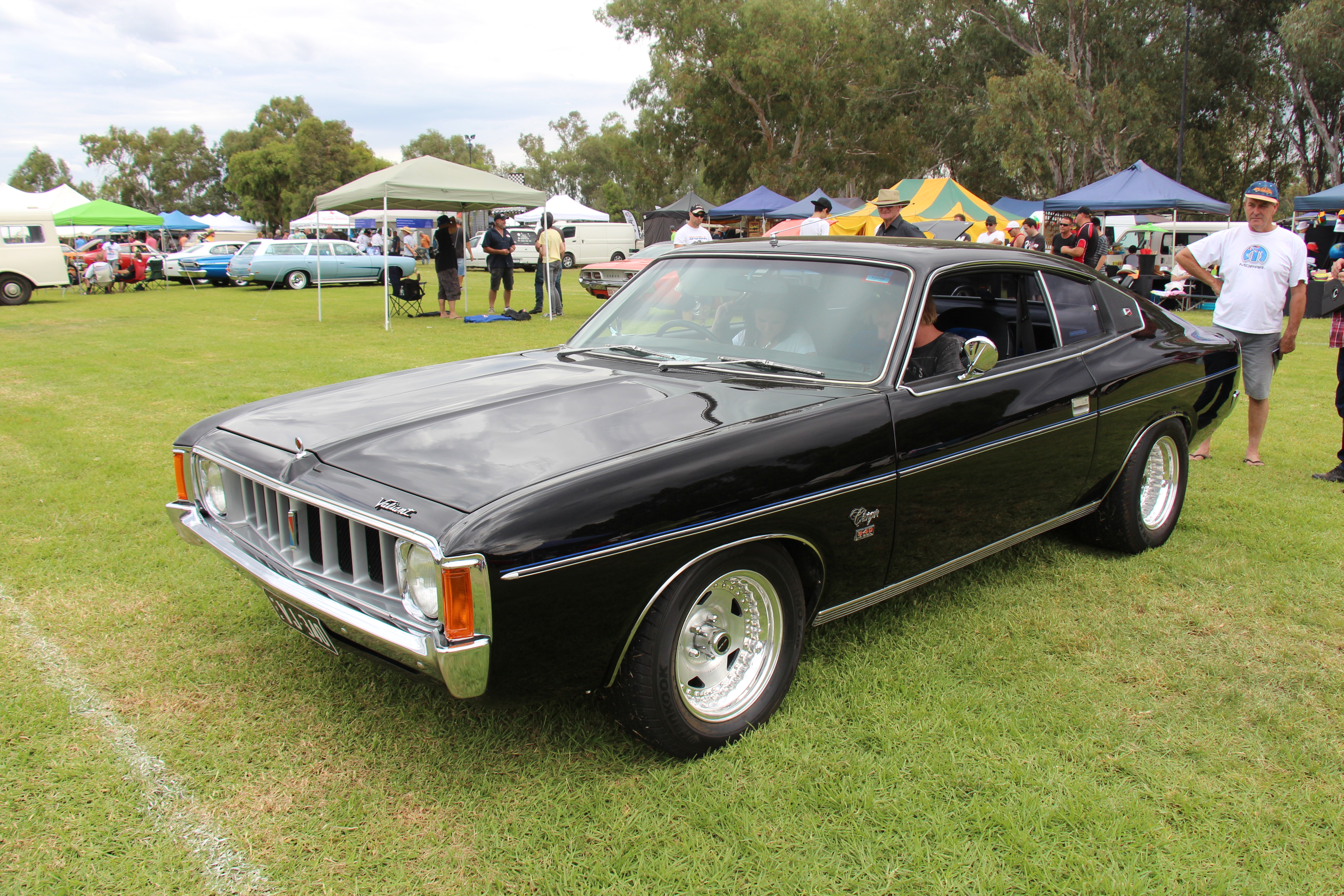
Chrysler VJ Valiant Charger 770 (with option E55 340 V8 engine)

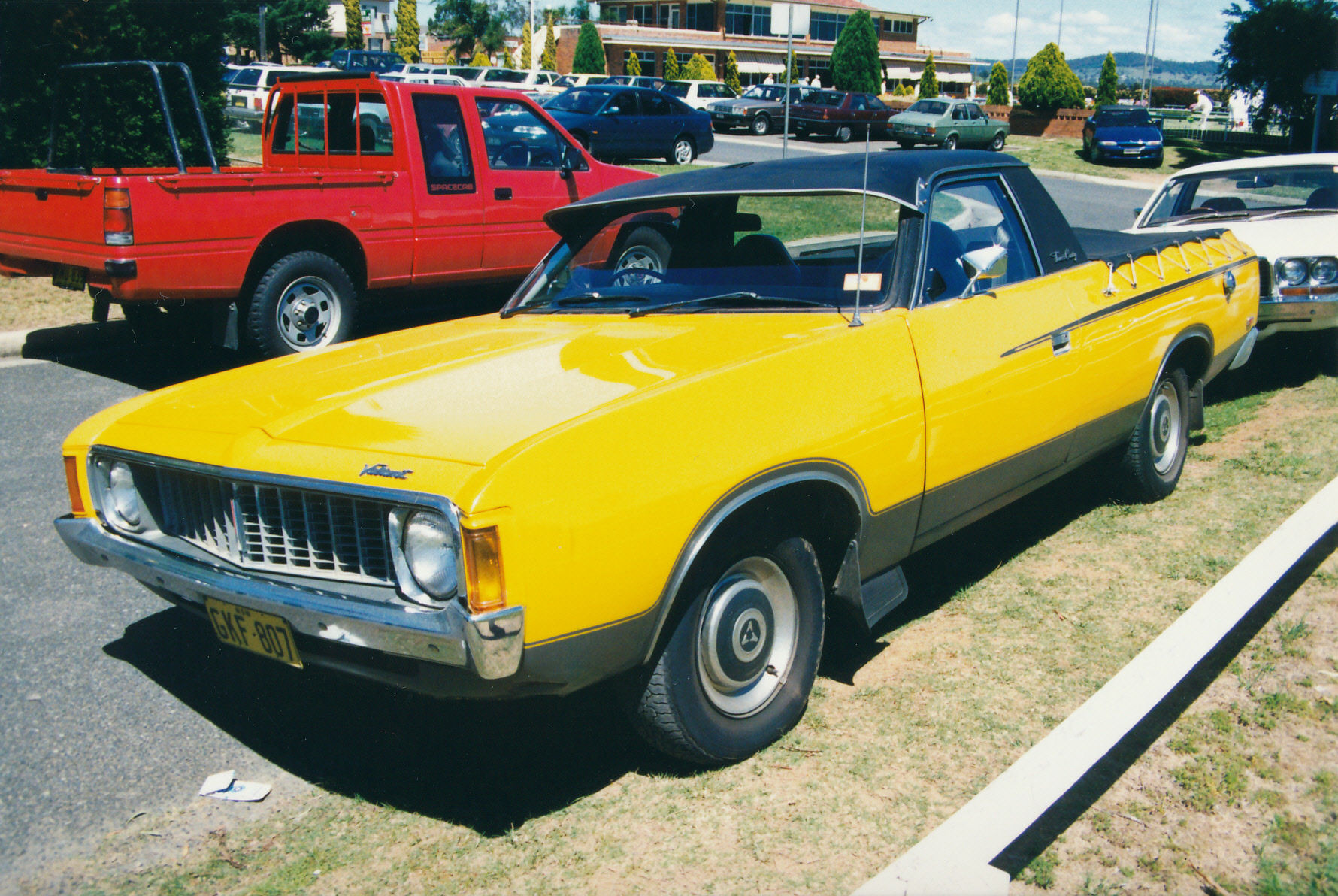
Chrysler VJ Valiant utility (with option A77 "Town & Country Pack")

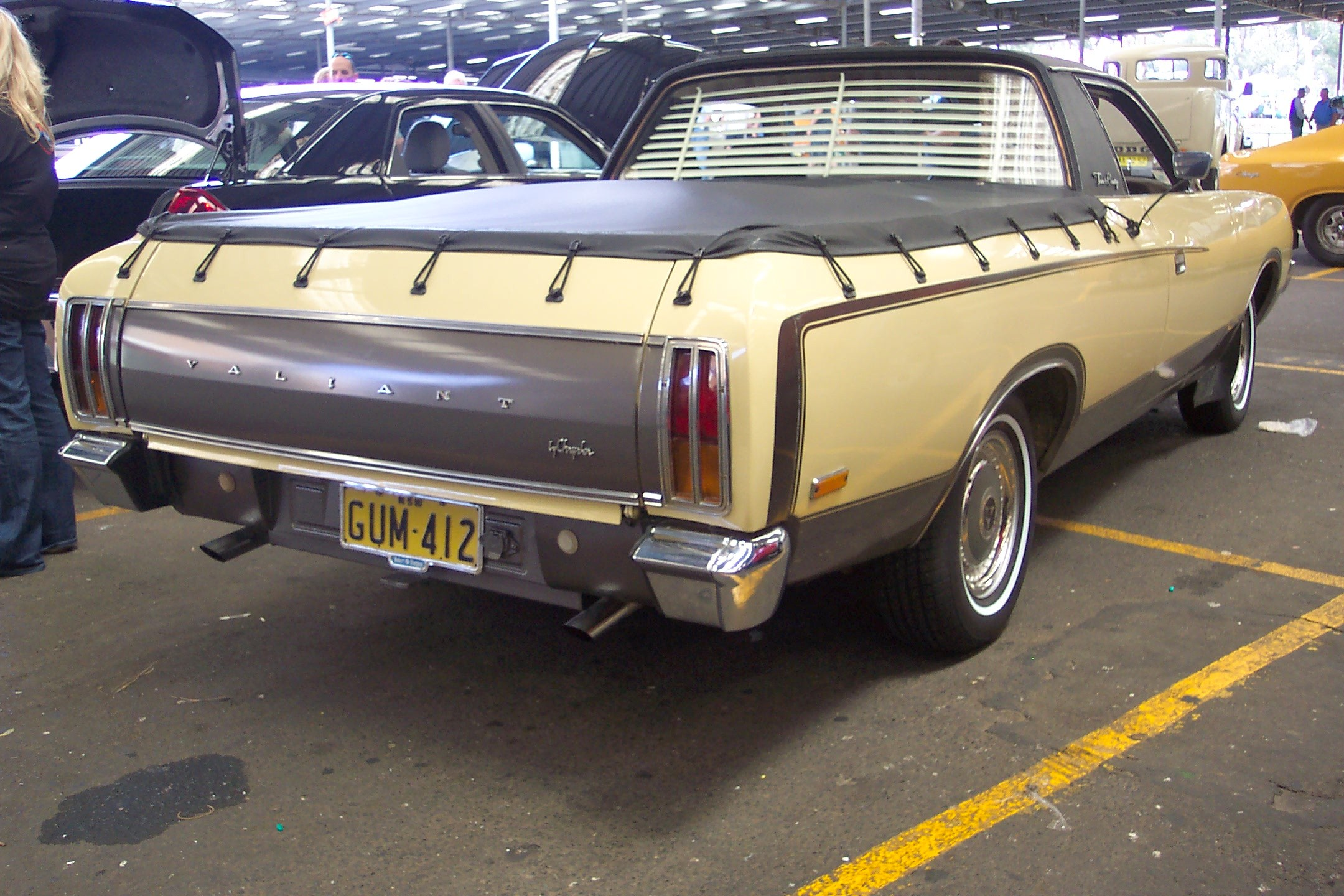
Chrysler VJ Valiant utility (with option A77 "Town & Country Pack")

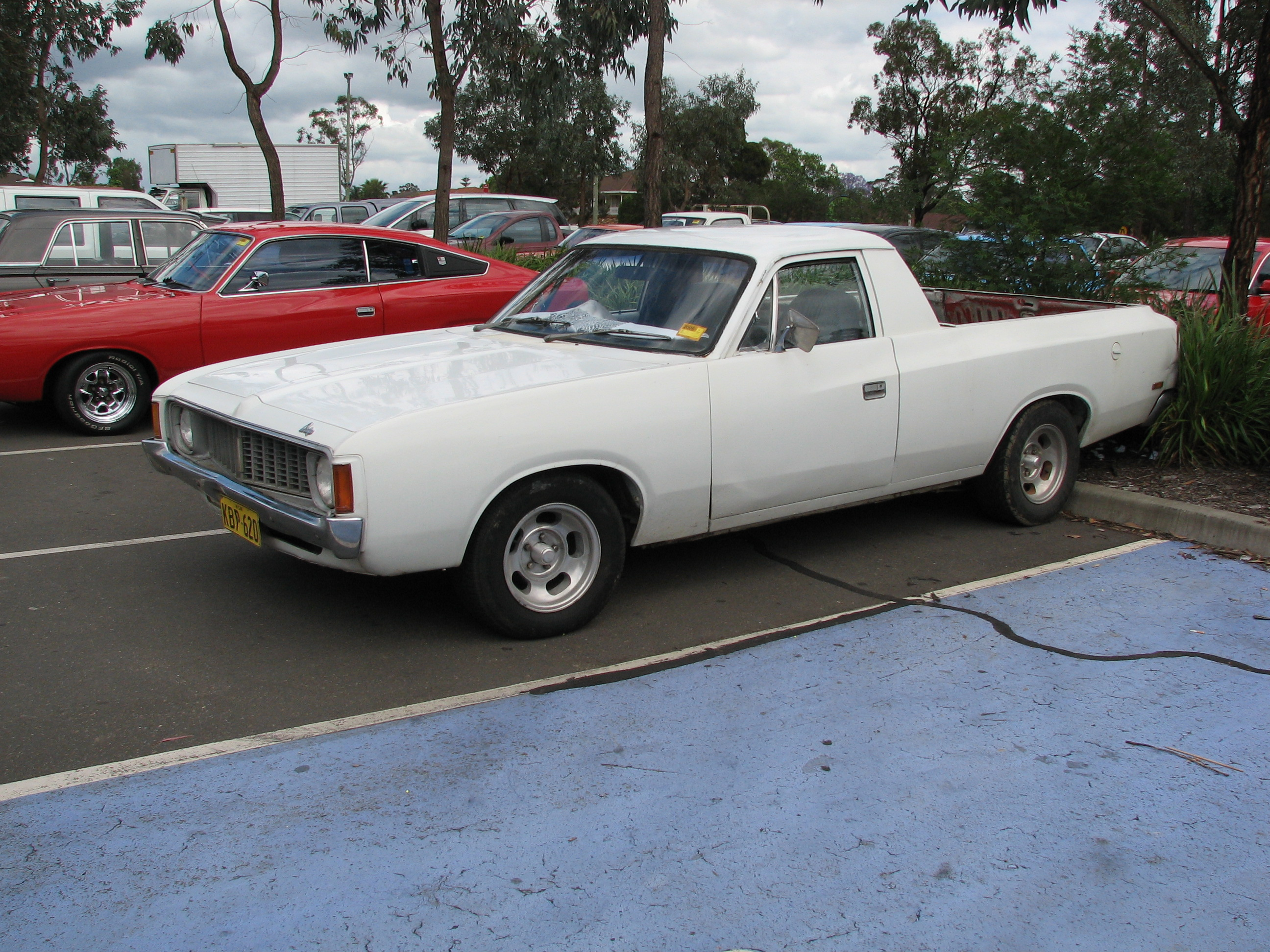
Dodge VJ utility (with non-standard alloy wheels)

== Limited editions ==
A limited edition Valiant Charger Sportsman model was introduced in August 1974. It was available only in “Vintage Red”, with bold white exterior striping, plaid cloth seat inserts and various other extras. It was fitted with the Hemi 265 engine and a four-speed manual gearbox. 500 examples were produced.

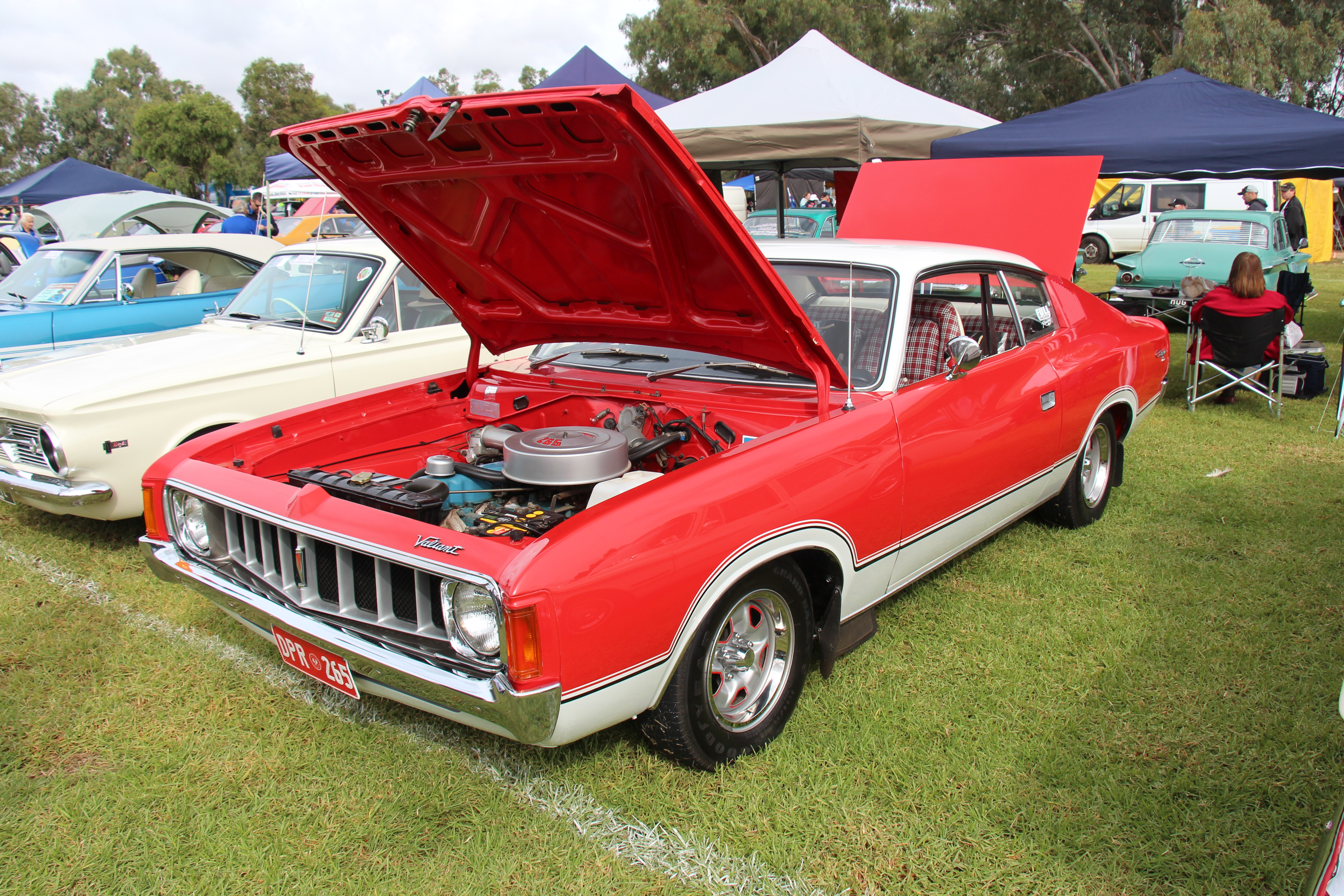
Chrysler Valiant VJ Charger Sportsman coupe

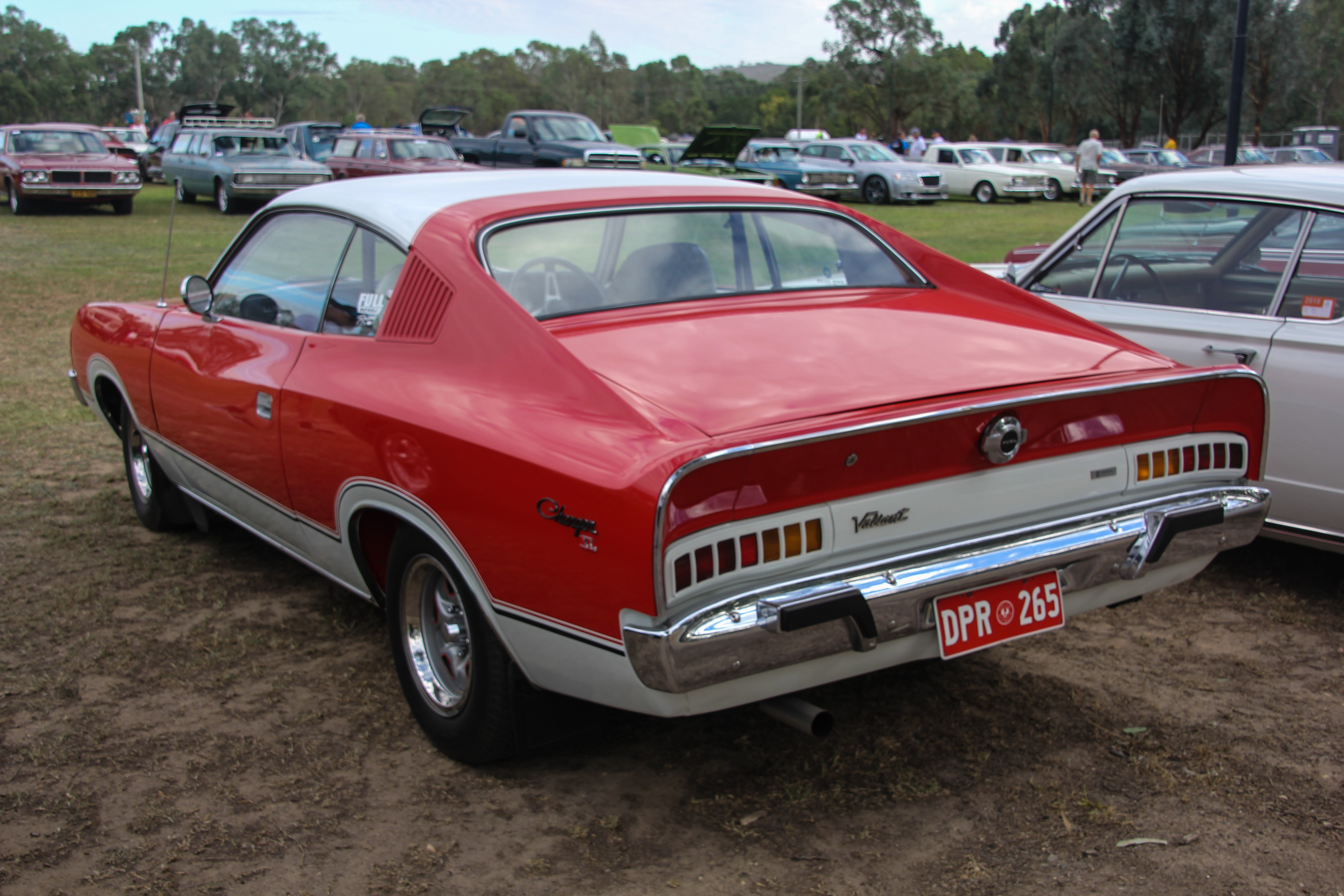
Chrysler VJ Valiant Charger Sportsman coupe

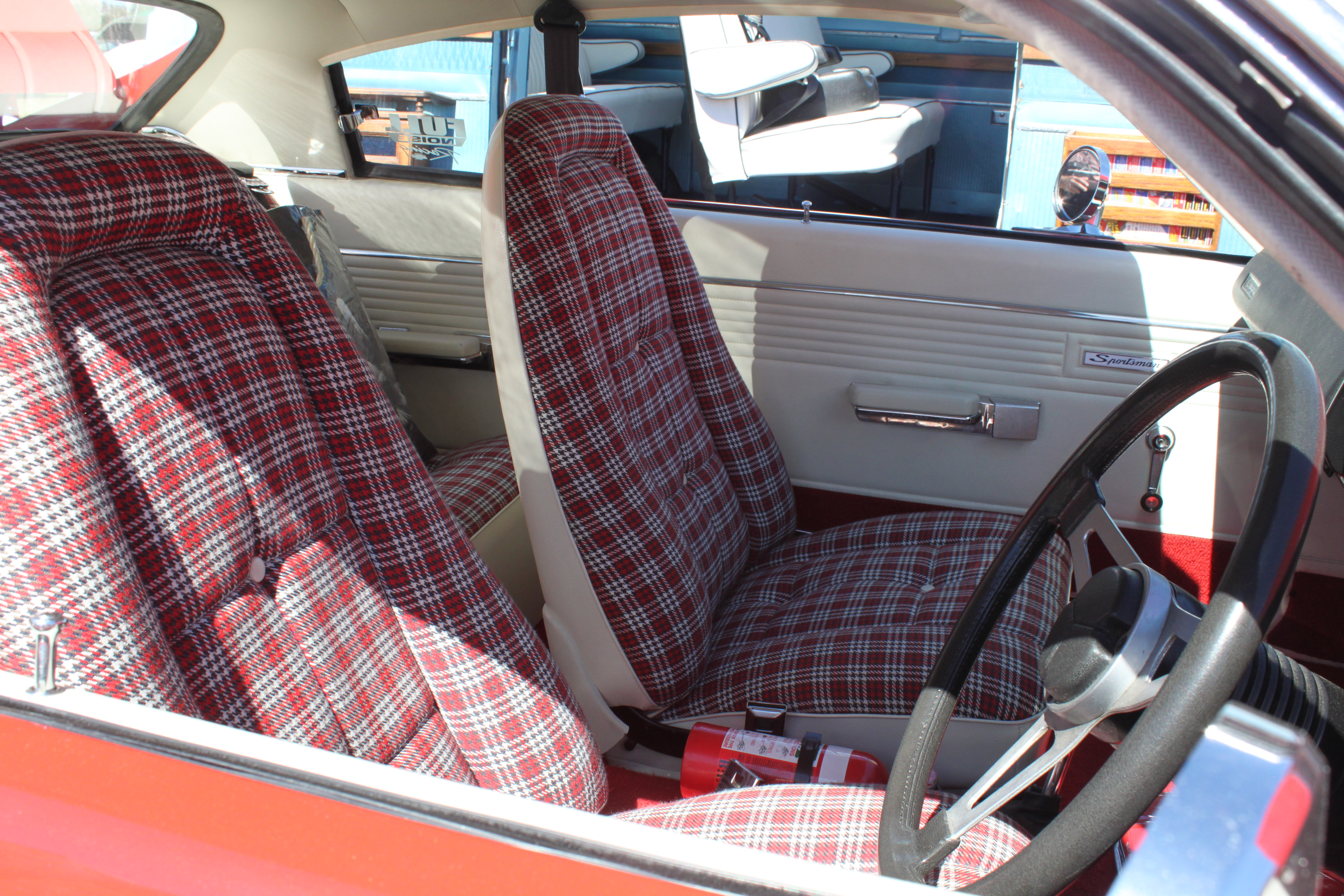
VJ Charger Sportsman tartan interior trim

== Engines and transmissions ==
Chrysler Australia's "Hemi 6" straight-six engine was offered in three displacements, 215 cid (3.5 litre), 245 cid (4.0 litre) and 265 cid (4.3 litre). A 318 cid V8 was also offered and a number of Chargers were produced with the 340 cid V8. A 360 cid V8 replaced the 340 in 1974. 3-speed manual, 4-speed manual, and 3-speed automatic transmissions were offered.

== Production and replacement ==
A total of 90,865 VJ Valiants were built, more than any other Australian Valiant series. Production consisted of 49,198 sedans, 15,241 wagons, 10,509 Chargers, 1,067 hardtops and 14,856 utilities. The VJ Valiant was replaced by the VK Valiant in October 1975.

== New Zealand ==
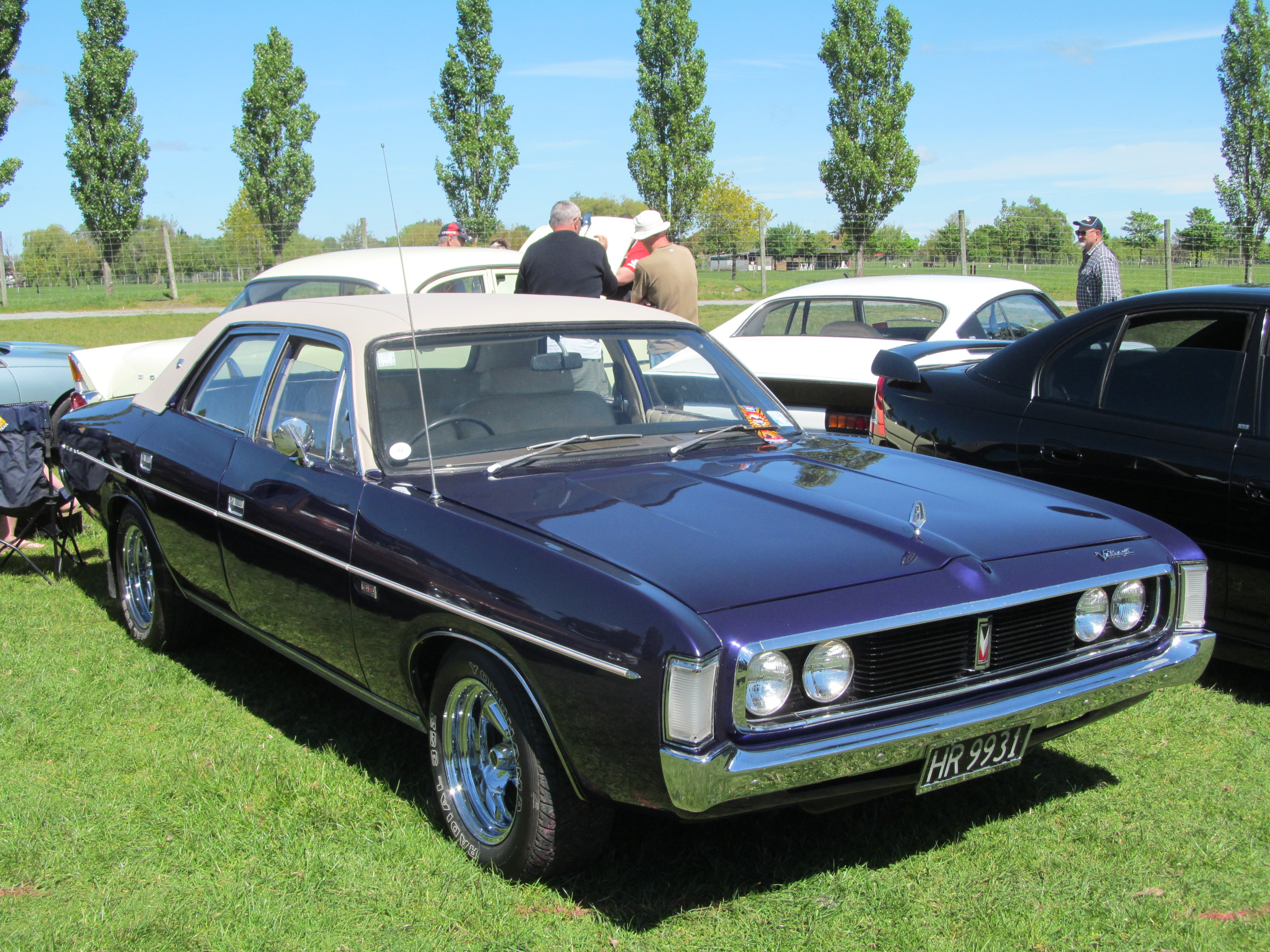
New Zealand VJ Valiant, a combination of the VJ and VH Valiant, and CH Chrysler

VJ Valiant assembly for New Zealand initially commenced at the Todd Motors assembly plant in Petone, and was then transferred to the new Todd park facility in nearby Porirua in 1975, with the base-model Ranger XL sedan being by far the most popular variant.

The New Zealand VJ Regal 770 was essentially a merger of a VJ Regal with a CH Chrysler by Chrysler. The nose combined the CH's four headlamps and grille with the VH Valiant bumper and front sheetmetal (retaining the older, larger, clear park/indicator lamps) while the rest of the body was as per the Australian VJ. Inside, new front seats were CH style, with individual chairs forming a bench shape, and a column automatic shifter was now used. New Zealand VJ Regals also had a vinyl roof in black or beige and the panel between the tail lights was also trimmed in vinyl to match – the vinyl trim could be deleted to order.

The VJ Charger was also assembled by Todds in limited variants and was unique in being the only one of the "big three" coupes of the period to be assembled outside of Australia.

== South Africa ==
Sold as the Valiant J series, the South African assembled Chrysler Valiant lineup included the Rebel, Rebel 660, Regal, Regal Safari, and the VIP. During 1975 the "J½ series" appeared, first as the VIP only but gradually spreading down the range. Sound deadening was improved, while the Regal sedan also received a new "iso-clamp" rear axle insulator. The Regals also received new seats, while all J½ series Valiants could be recognized by the ventless front door windows.

== United Kingdom ==
As with the VH, the VJ continued to be imported into the United Kingdom, albeit in small numbers. 1974 was the first year that the Australian Valiants were properly represented in U.K brochures. VJ models offered in 1974 were the Regal Saloon, Regal Estate Car, Charger, and CH saloon (possibly unsold 1973 stock.) All U.K exports had automatic gearboxes. The cars were considered expensive and did not compete well with local Ford and Vauxhall offerings.

== Chrysler CJ series ==
Chrysler Australia also produced the Chrysler CJ series, a long wheelbase, luxury model developed from the VJ Valiant.

== See also ==
- Chrysler Valiant
- Chrysler Valiant Charger
