= ADR27A =

Former Australian design rule

Australian Design Rule 27A (ADR27A) was an Australian Design Rule specifying design and operating regulations to limit fuel evaporative and exhaust emissions for motor vehicles in Australia in order to reduce air pollution.

The rule covered "all motor vehicles specified below (see Table 1) equipped with petrol fuelled spark ignition internal combustion engines except those also equipped to use use liquified petroleum gas (LPG) and those with and engine displacement of less than 850 millilitres (850cc), manufactured on or after 1 July 1976."

The rule replaced the previous rule ADR27 (introduced 1 September 1973), and remained in effect until replaced by ADR37/00 (introduced 1 July 1988).

== Amendments ==
An amendment was made to the rule affecting vehicles manufactured on or after 1 January 1978 altering the deterioration factor for testing criteria to revised values - refer Criteria

== Compliance ==
Table 1: ADR27A vehicle coverage

The rule was endorsed by the Australian Transport Advisory Council (ATAC), and covered all Australian states and territories. Vehicles required to comply with ADR27A were mostly passenger vehicles and light goods vehicles based upon passenger vehicles manufactured on or after 1 July 1976. Table 1 defines those which were required to comply with or were exempt from the rule.

=== Exemptions ===
Vehicles exempt from the rule, as they fell under the regulations of a different rule included:

- vehicles that complied with ADR27B
- light commercial vehicles tested for compliance with ADR37 (later replaced by ADR79)
- heavy duty (usually diesel-engined) vehicles tested for compliance complied with ADR36 (later replaced by ADR80)
- diesel-engined vehicles not covered by ADR36 or ADR37 tested for compliance with ADR70
- racing vehicles driven on tracks or circuits other than open public roads.

== Criteria ==
The rule specified maximum permissible limits for fuel evaporative and exhaust emissions with specific criteria for:

- Fuel evaporative emissions - hydrocarbons
- Exhaust emissions - hydrocarbons
- Exhaust emissions - carbon monoxide
- Exhaust emissions - oxides of nitrogen

An emission stabilisation period was established for between 0–6400 km, then a durability test to 8000 km was performed whereby a deterioration factor was calculated as follows:

Category	Calculation of deterioration factor
Exhaust Emissions	Established emissions at 80000 km divided by established emissions at 6400 km
Fuel Evaporative Emissions	Established emissions at 80000 km minus established emissions at 6400 km

The rule was updated to allow greater deterioration factors for vehicles manufactured on or after 1 January 1978. Maximum permissible limits for each testing criteria were:

Category	Criteria	Maximum Value	Deterioration Factor	
Category	Criteria	Maximum Value	to 1 Jan 78	from 1 Jan 78
Fuel Evaporative Emissions	hydrocarbons	2 g per test	+0.2 g	+0.2 g
Exhaust emissions	hydrocarbons	2.1 g per km	1.0	1.1
Exhaust emissions	carbon monoxide	24.2 g per km	1.0	1.1
Exhaust emissions	oxides of nitrogen	1.9 g per km	1.0	1.1

=== Other Requirements ===
The rule stated other requirements including:

- labels placed within a vehicle's engine bay specifying engine tuning specifications (e.g. idle speed, ignition timing, etc.)
- written instructions with each new vehicle sold specifying use of and maintenance requirements for emission control systems

== Testing ==
Prior to the release of a new model, manufacturers were required to submit a certain number of new vehicles for testing for each different engine available across a specific model's range. The number of vehicles required for testing depended upon expected production volumes.

Testing was undertaken within strictly controlled conditions, with specific parameters defined for:

- ambient temperature
- fuel temperature
- volume of fuel in fuel tank
- etc.

Only those models which passed compliance testing were eligible for sale to be driven on Australian public roads.

== Impact ==
The rule required manufacturers to introduce emission control systems to the engines of road-registered vehicles on sale within Australia. In some cases, manufacturers were also required to modify the engines of these vehicles, mostly in the areas of cylinder heads, camshafts, carburettors and ignitions systems to meet the "cleaner" requirements. As a result, ADR27A-compliant engines generally produced less power than previous non-compliant versions.

The rule prohibited the commercial importation of vehicles manufactured outside of Australia that did not comply with the rule, or the modification or supplying of alternate engines to vehicles manufactured or sold in Australia that would result in vehicles no longer complying with the requirements. Where vehicles were privately imported or engines modified, they had to be inspected and certified by an authorised compliance engineer. Vehicles that failed testing, or compliance testing had not been undertaken, were deemed unroadworthy and penalties and/or bans applied (usually varying from state to state) if the vehicles were driven on public roads.
