= Chrysler Valiant (CM) =

Australian full-size car

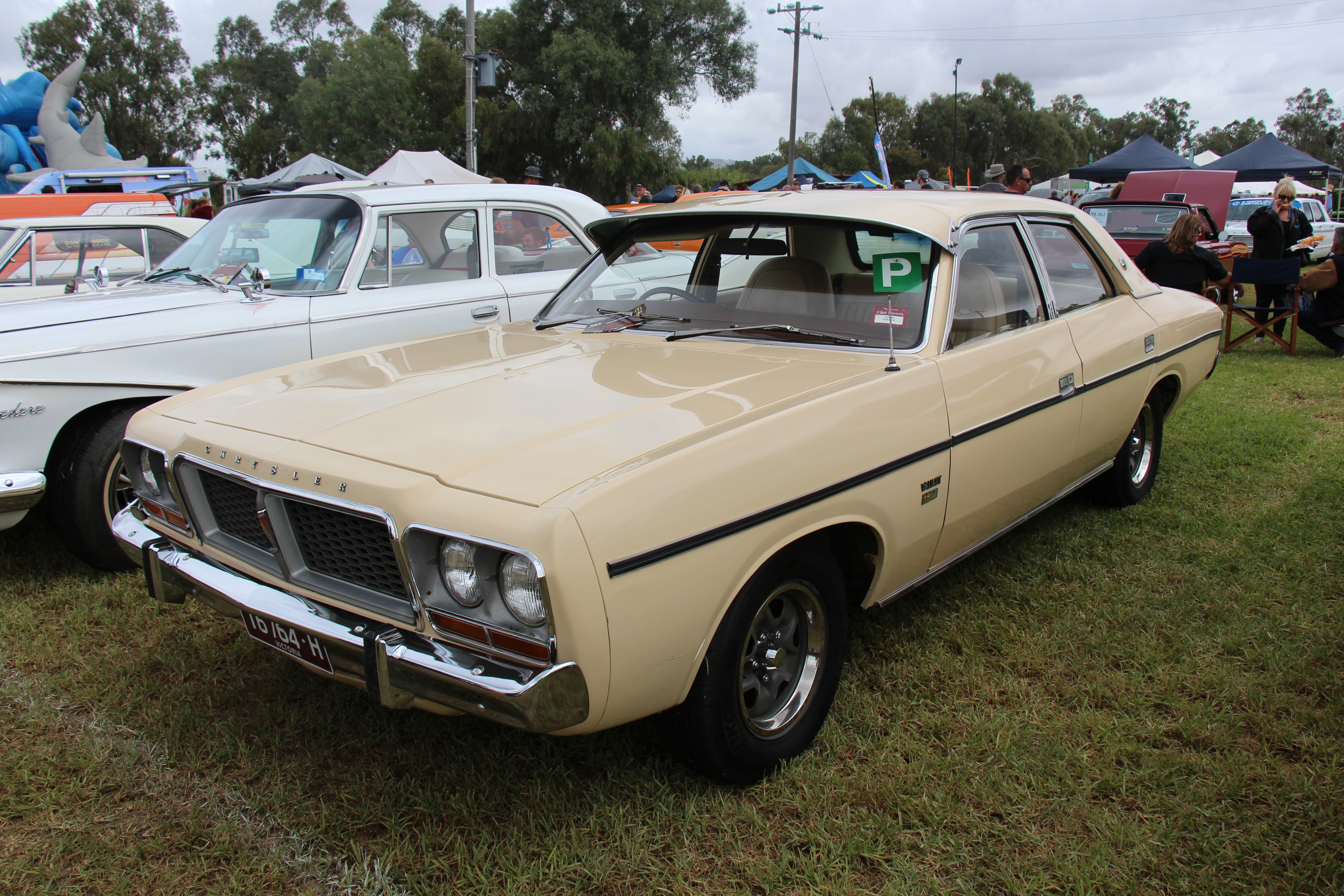
- Chrysler CM Valiant Sedan

Overview
- Manufacturer: Chrysler Australia (1978–1980); Mitsubishi Australia (1980–1981)
- Production: November 1978 – August 1981
- Assembly: Australia: Tonsley Park; New Zealand: Petone (Todd Motors)

Body and chassis
- Body style: 4-door sedan 5-door station wagon
- Layout: FR layout

Powertrain
- Engine: 245 cu in (4.0 L) I6; 265 cu in (4.3 L) I6; 318 cu in (5.2 L) V8
- Transmission: 3-speed manual 4-speed manual 3-speed automatic

Dimensions
- Wheelbase: 111 inches (2819 mm)
- Length: 197.5 inches (5016 mm) (Sedan)
- Width: 74.6 inches (1895 mm)
- Height: 55.4 inches (1407 mm) (Sedan)
- Kerb weight: 3368 lb (1528 kg) (Sedan)

Chronology
- Predecessor: Chrysler CL Valiant
- Successor: Mitsubishi Magna

The Chrysler Valiant (CM) is an automobile that was produced in Australia by Chrysler Australia from 1978 to 1980 and subsequently by Mitsubishi Australia from 1980 to 1981. It was a facelifted and revised version of the Chrysler CL Valiant, which it replaced. It was the last Australian Chrysler Valiant.

== Model range ==
The CM Valiant was offered in 4 door sedan and 5 door station wagon body styles in the following models:

- Chrysler Valiant sedan
- Chrysler Valiant wagon
- Chrysler Regal sedan
- Chrysler Regal wagon
- Chrysler Regal SE sedan

Regal models were marketed as Chrysler Regals, without the Valiant name.

A GLX pack, option code A16, was offered on the CM Valiant sedan. It featured the 265 cubic inch (4.3 litre) engine, the four speed manual transmission, or 3 speed auto or the 318 v8 engine with an auto, “Hot Wire” cast alloy wheels, a tachometer, front grille paint treatment, tinted side glass, roof console with map light, rear seat armrest, floor console, body stripes and other embellishments.

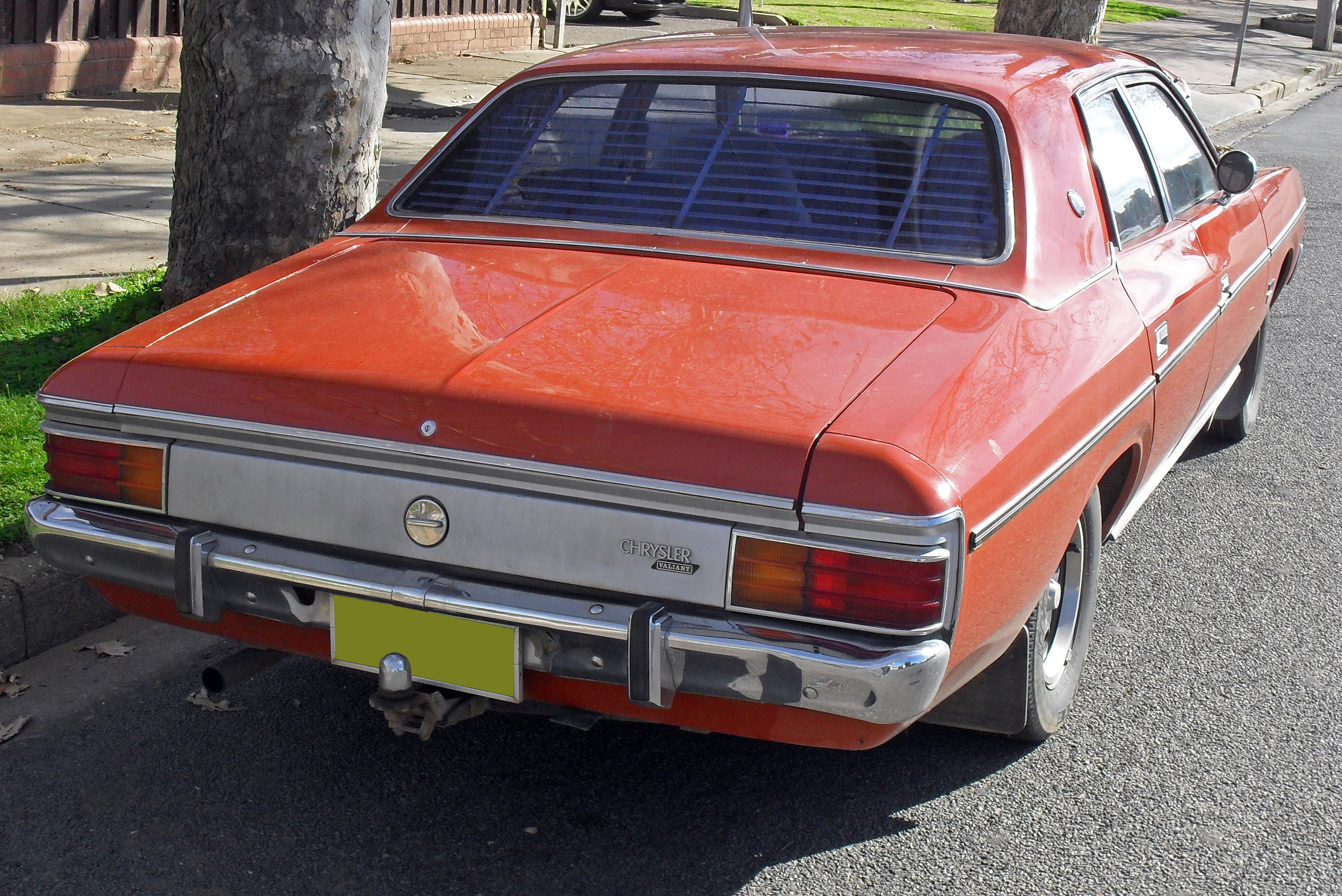
Chrysler CM Valiant Sedan

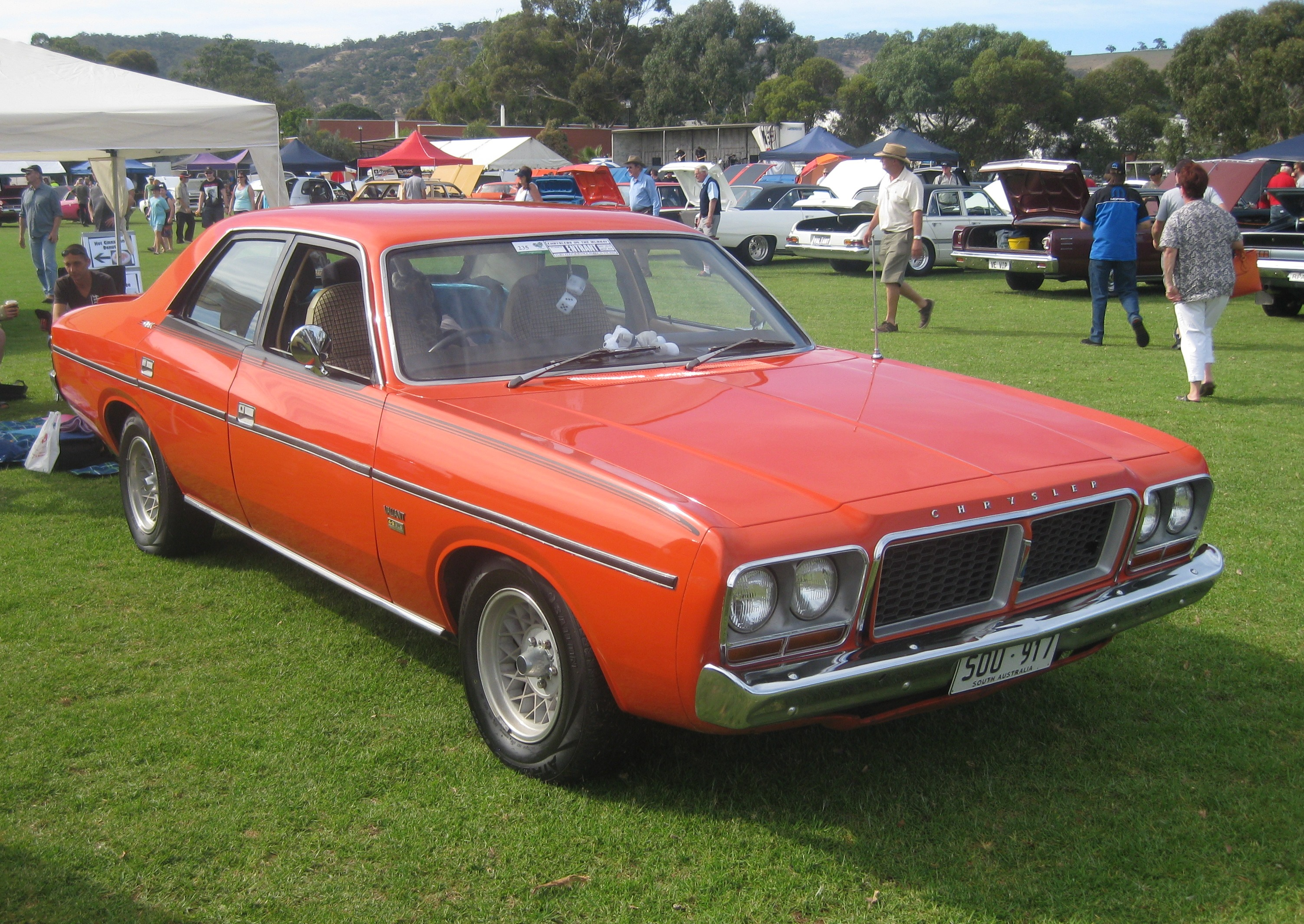
Chrysler CM Valiant Sedan with GLX pack

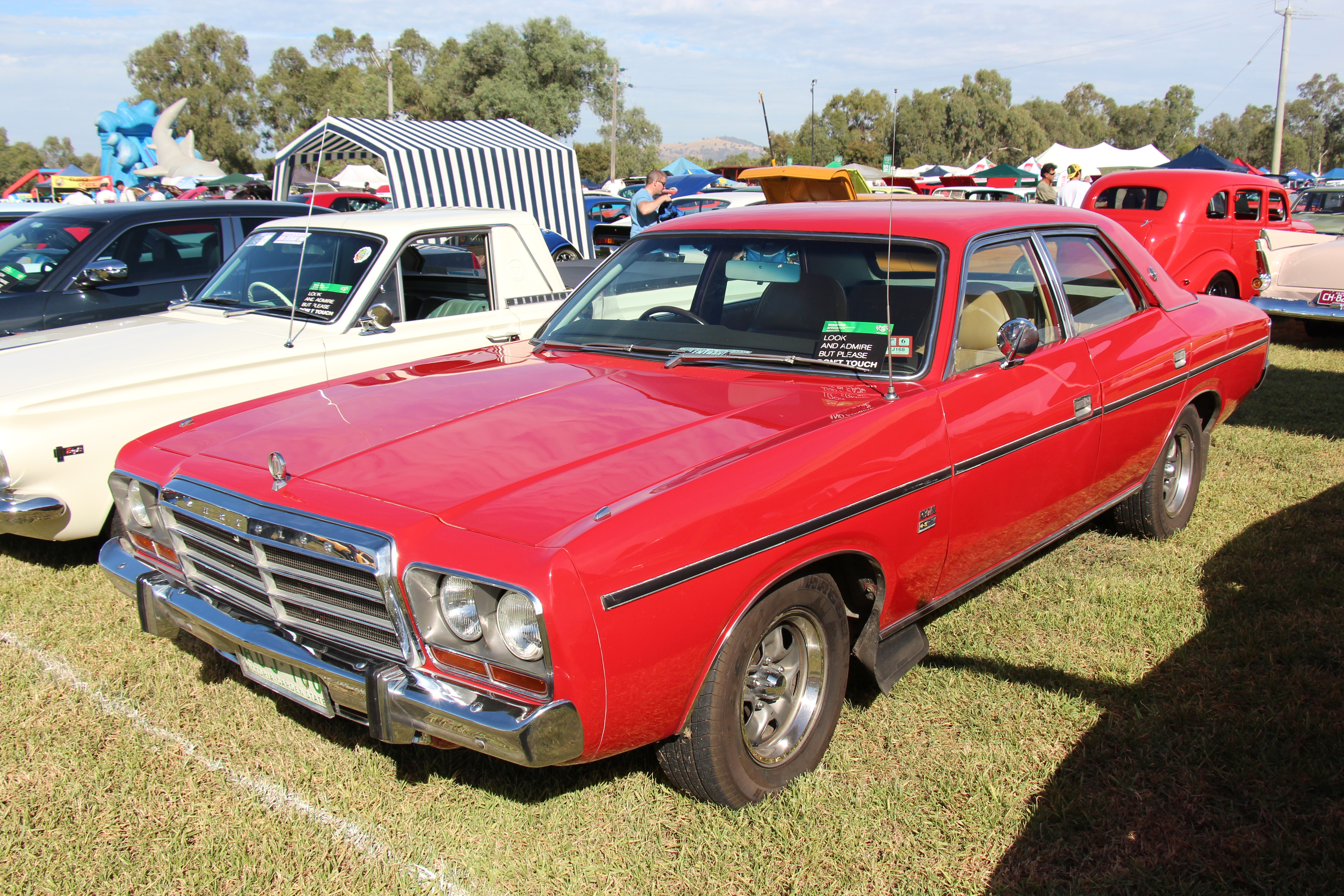
Chrysler CM Regal Sedan

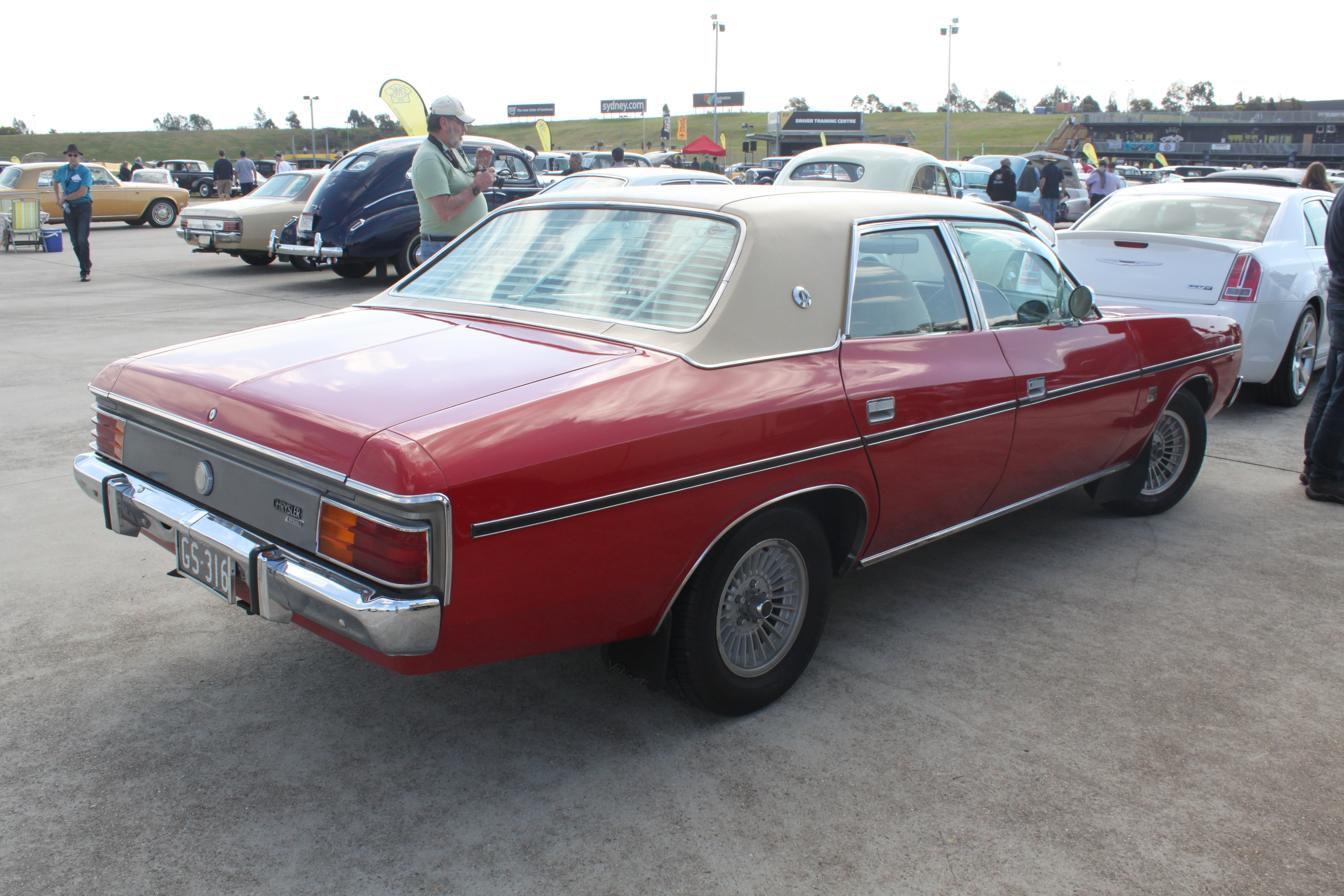
Chrysler Valiant CM Regal sedan

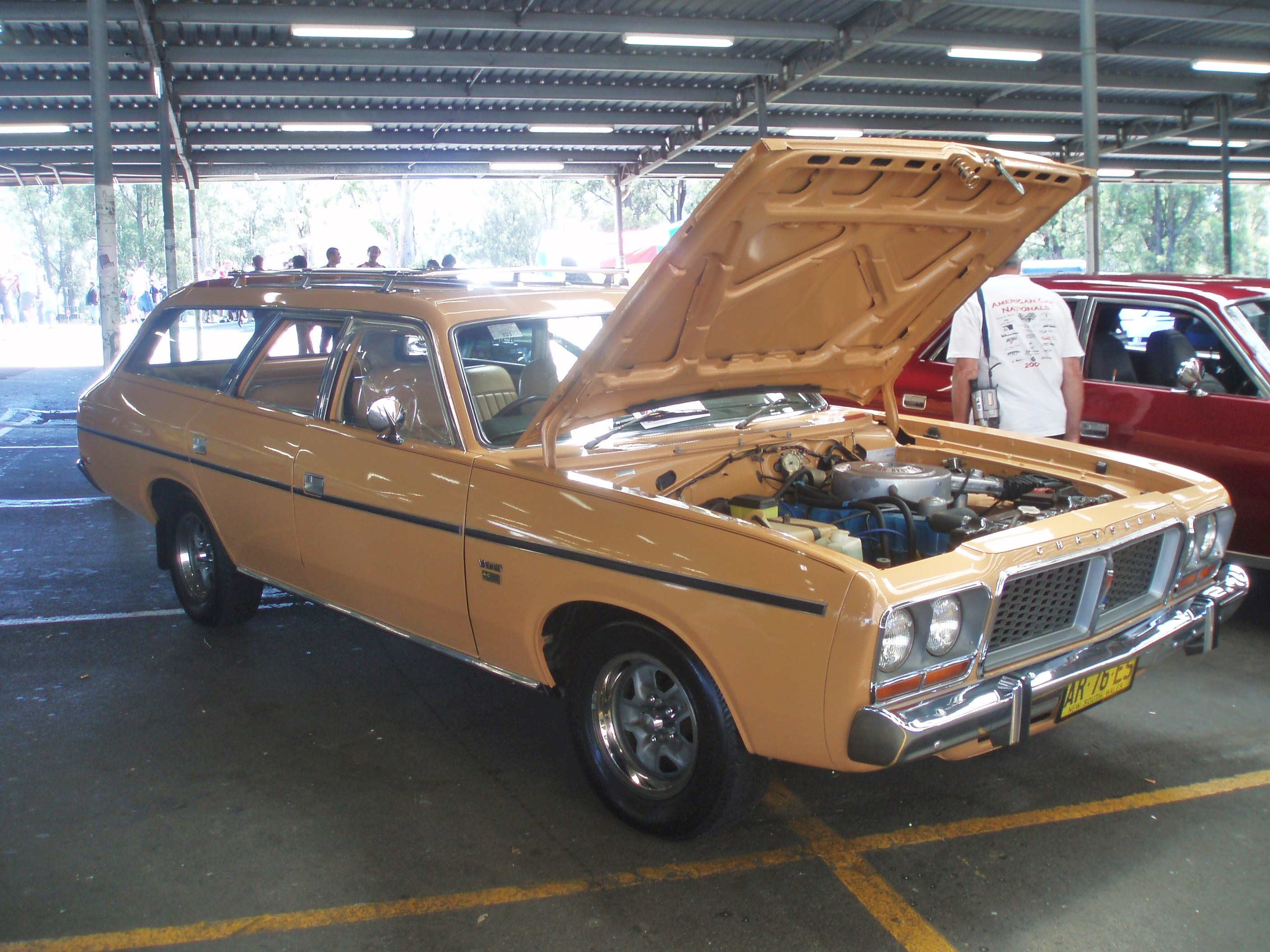
Chrysler CM Valiant wagon

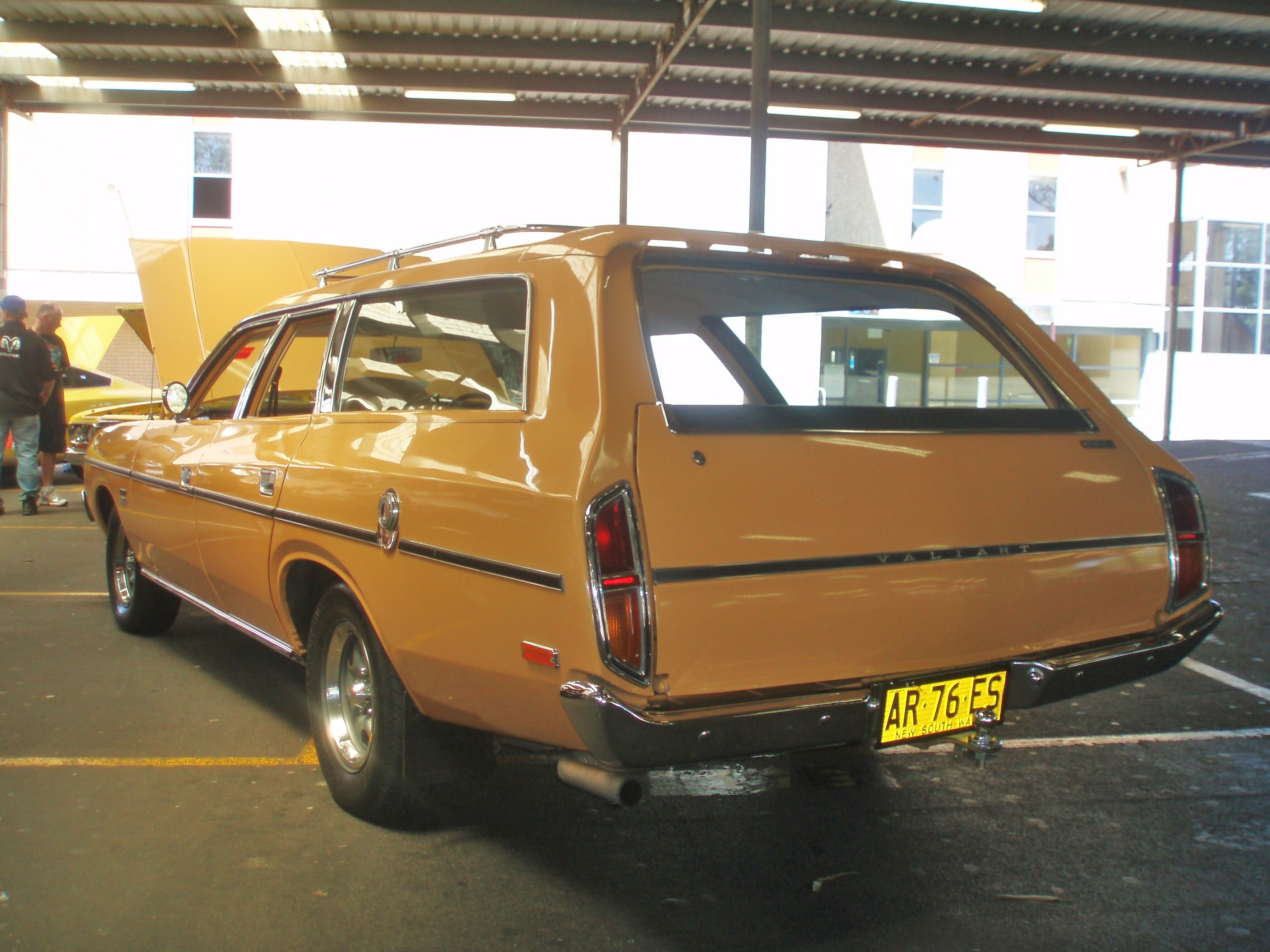
Chrysler CM Valiant wagon

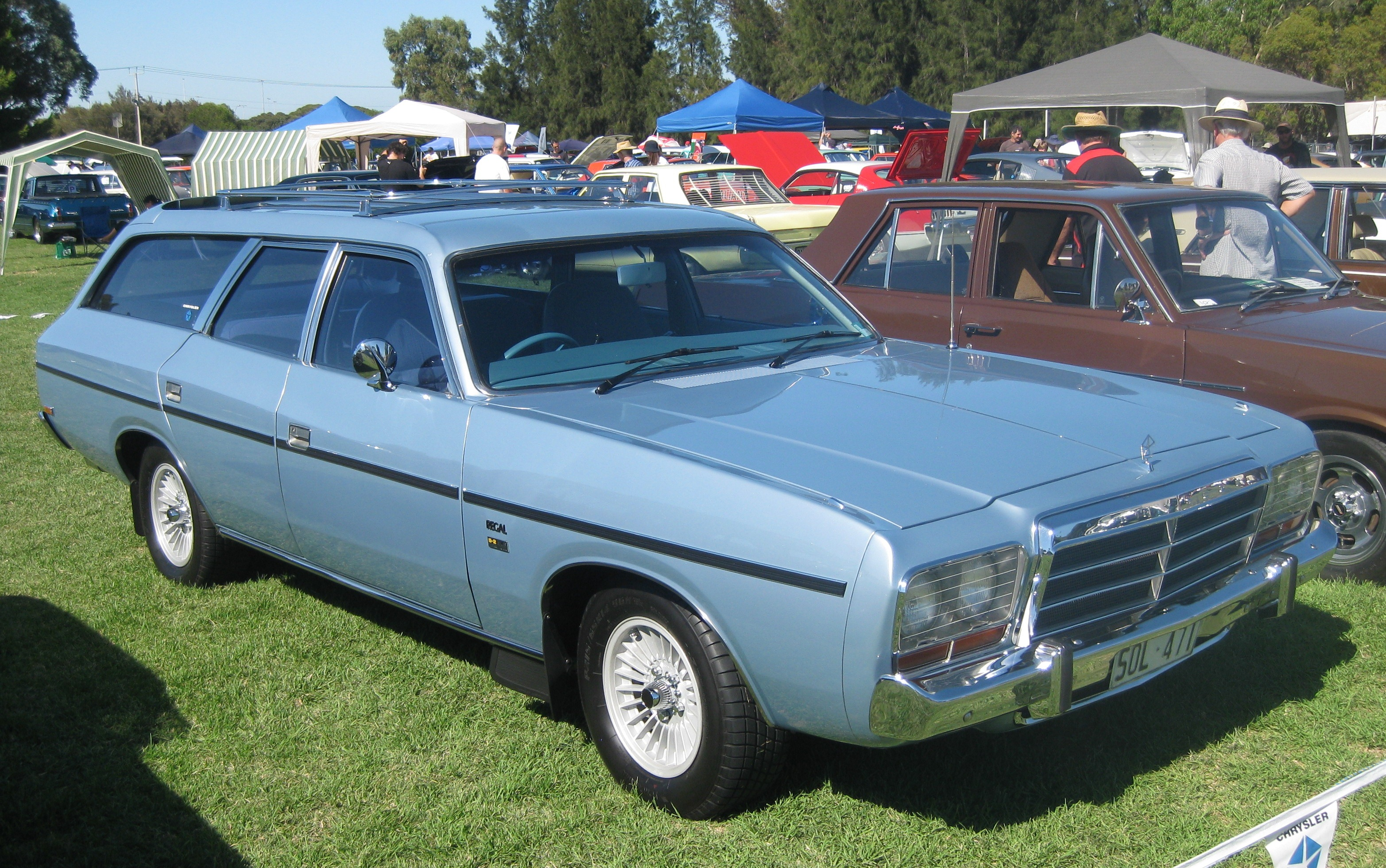
Chrysler CM Regal Wagon

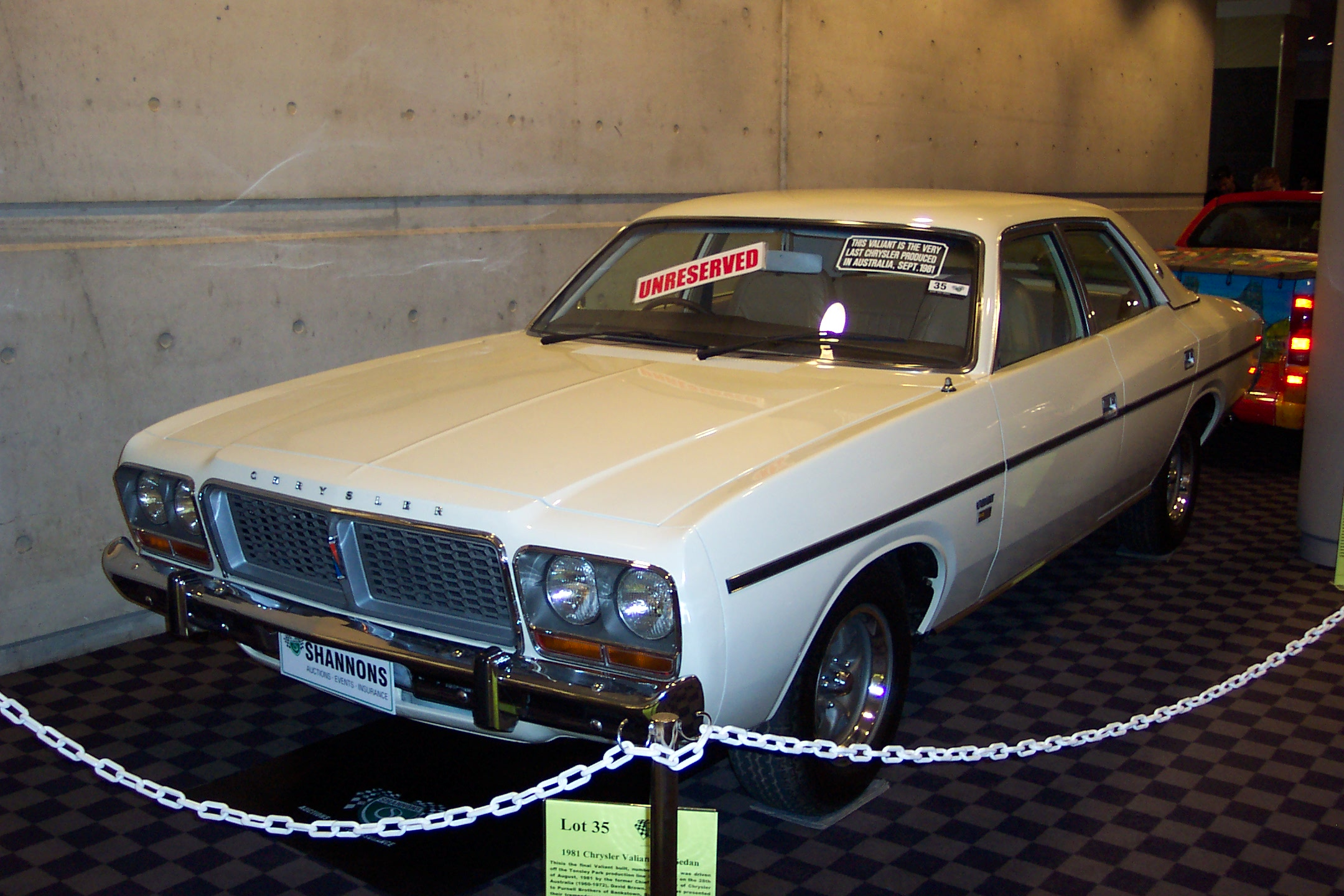
Last Australian Valiant built, August 28, 1981 was this Chrysler CM Valiant, a white 4.0 litre automatic sedan seen here on display prior to auction in 2003

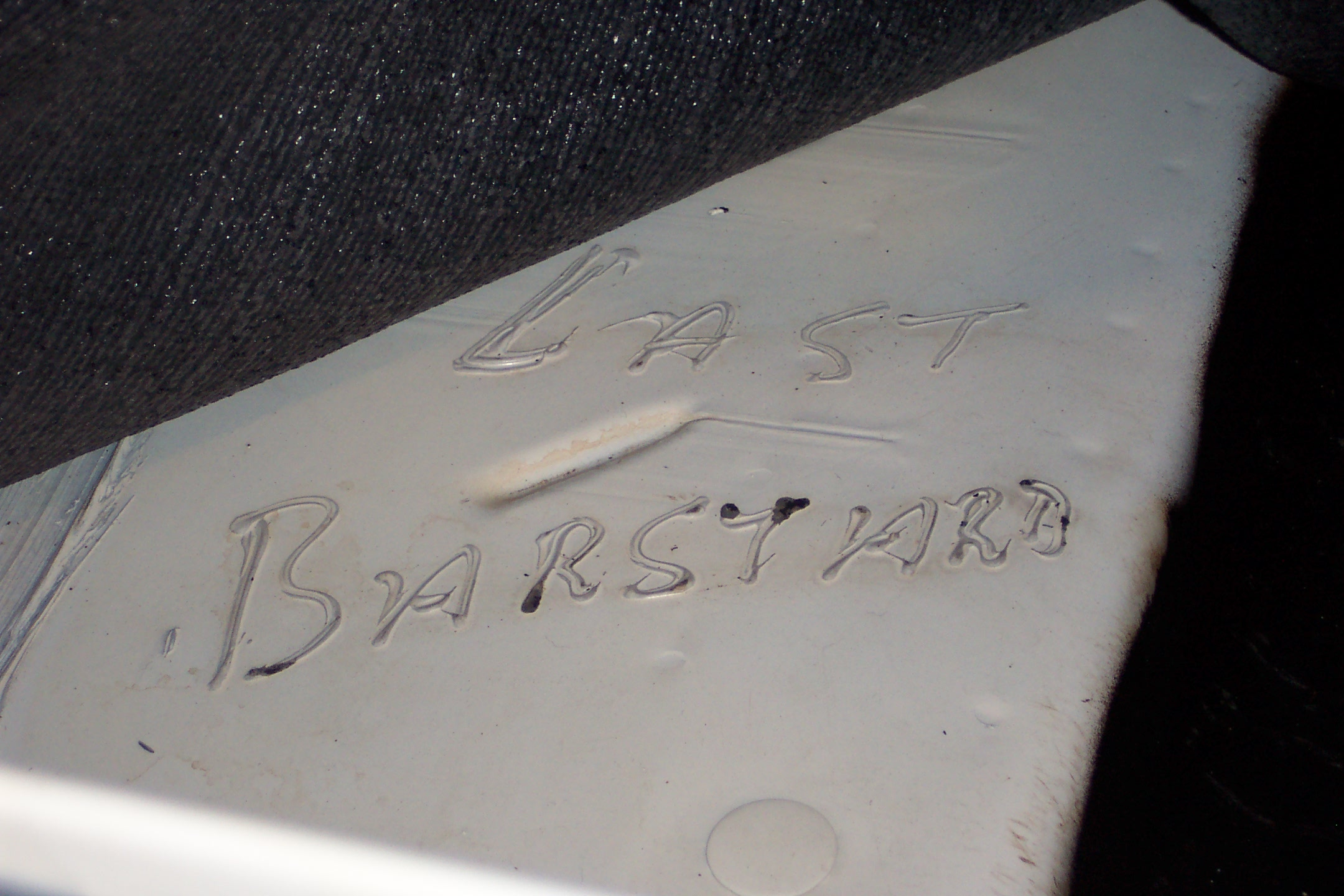
"Last Barstard" (sic) written in the body sealer under the boot floor carpet on the last Australian Valiant built by an assembly line worker

== Changes ==
The CM models featured a new grille, revised tail lights plus new mouldings and badges. All body panels were carried over from the previous model. The six cylinder engines were now fitted with Chrysler’s “Electronic Lean Burn System” which resulted in easier starting, better responsiveness, smoother running and improved fuel economy.

Utility, Panel Van and Charger coupe models were not carried over from the CL Valiant range.

== Engines and transmissions ==
Three engines were offered:

- 245 cu in (4.0 L) I6
- 265 cu in (4.3 L) I6
- 318 cu in (5.2 L) V8

The 318 cu in (5.2 L) V8 engine option was discontinued around August–September 1980.

Five transmissions were offered:

- 3 speed manual
- 4 speed manual
- 3 speed Torquflite automatic
- 3 speed TorqueFlite A904 automatic
- 3 speed Borg-Warner automatic

== Production and replacement ==
The CM Valiant was produced by Chrysler Australia from 1978 until the takeover of that company by Mitsubishi in 1980. Mitsubishi Australia continued production through to 28 August 1981. Although Mitsubishi did not want to continue the model it needed to produce cars to meet Australian local content requirements. 97% of the car was made in Australia and the tooling was well and truly paid for, so it was profitable for the company to produce even a small number of Valiants. Rather than badge it as a "Mitsubishi" the Valiant continued to be badged as "Chrysler."

By 1980, Japanese cars were the most popular cars in Australia and the Valiant had become dated. Ford Australia and Holden were building new cars based on European designs (the Ford Falcon and Holden Commodore respectively) with modern styling and features that were absent from the 9-year-old Valiant platform. Chrysler's popularity in Australia had dropped from being one of the "Big Three" in the 1960s to 20th place by the end of the 1970s. The price of a CM Valiant was less than some small Japanese cars.

A total of 16,500 examples of the Chrysler CM were built with no immediate replacement model introduced. Eventually, the Mitsubishi Magna was developed to replace both the Valiant and smaller Sigma, and production started in 1985.

In the 21st Century, CM Valiants have become a collectible due to their final improvements and reliability of the then-praised Electronic Lean-Burn (ELB) system. Well-maintained models can reach over AU$20,000.

== See also ==
- Chrysler Valiant
