= Chrysler Valiant (CL) =

Australian full-size car

Chrysler Valiant (CL) Chrysler Regal (CL) Chrysler Charger (CL)
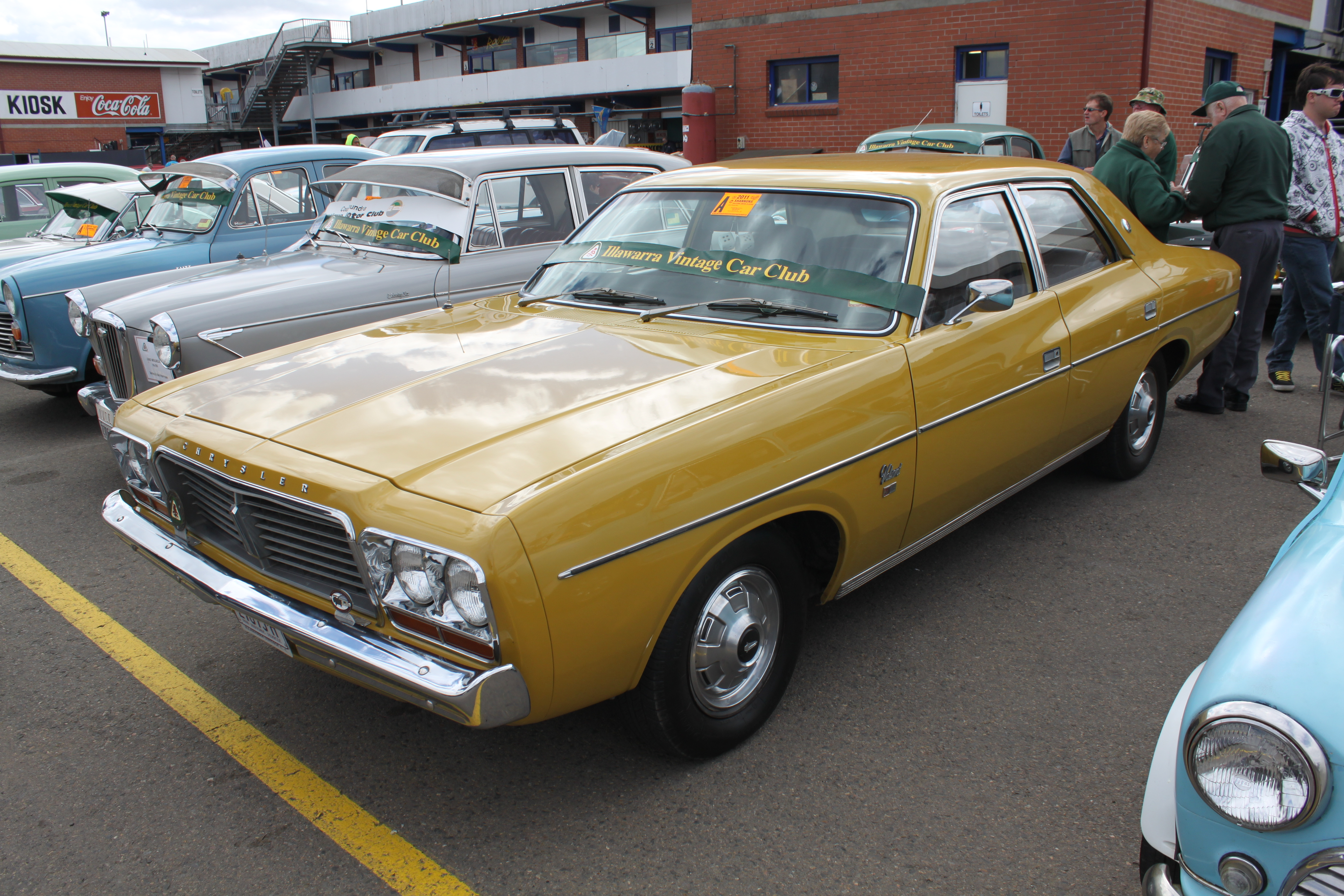
- Chrysler Valiant Sedan (CL)

Overview
- Manufacturer: Chrysler Australia
- Also called: Chrysler SE (South Africa)
- Production: November 1976 – October 1978
- Assembly: Australia: Tonsley Park; New Zealand: Petone (Todd Motors); South Africa: Pretoria (Sigma)

Body and chassis
- Body style: 4-door sedan 5-door station wagon 2-door coupé 2-door coupé utility 2-door panel van
- Layout: FR layout

Powertrain
- Engine: 225.0 cu in (3,687 cc) Slant-six I6 (South Africa); 245 cu in (4.0 L) I6; 265 cu in (4.3 L) I6; 318 cu in (5.2 L) V8
- Transmission: 3/4-speed manual 3-speed automatic

Dimensions
- Wheelbase: 105 (2667 mm) (Charger only); 111 inches (2819 mm) (other models)
- Length: 195.9 inches (4976 mm) (Sedan)
- Width: 74.2 inches (1885 mm)
- Height: 55.4 inches (1407 mm) (Sedan)
- Kerb weight: 3172 lb (1439 kg) (Sedan)

Chronology
- Predecessor: Chrysler Valiant (VK)
- Successor: Chrysler Valiant (CM)

The Chrysler Valiant (CL) is an automobile which was produced in Australia by Chrysler Australia from 1976 to 1978. The CL, which was the twelfth Australian Chrysler Valiant model, replaced the Chrysler Valiant (VK). It was also built in South Africa by Sigma, who marketed it there as the Chrysler SE.

== Changes ==
The Chrysler CL models featured new grilles, a new nose cone and new bonnet, and, (on sedans), new rear panels including boot lid, lower panel and quarter panel. A panel van body style was added to the range in April 1977.

== Model range ==
The Chrysler CL passenger car range comprised 4 door sedan, 5 door station wagon and 2-door coupe body styles in the following models:

- Chrysler Valiant Sedan
- Chrysler Valiant Wagon
- Chrysler Regal Sedan
- Chrysler Regal Wagon
- Chrysler Regal SE Sedan
- Chrysler Charger 770 Coupe

The Chrysler CL commercial vehicle range comprised a 2-door coupe utility and a 2-door panel van.

- Chrysler Valiant Utility
- Chrysler Valiant Panel Van

Regal and Charger models were not designated as Valiants.

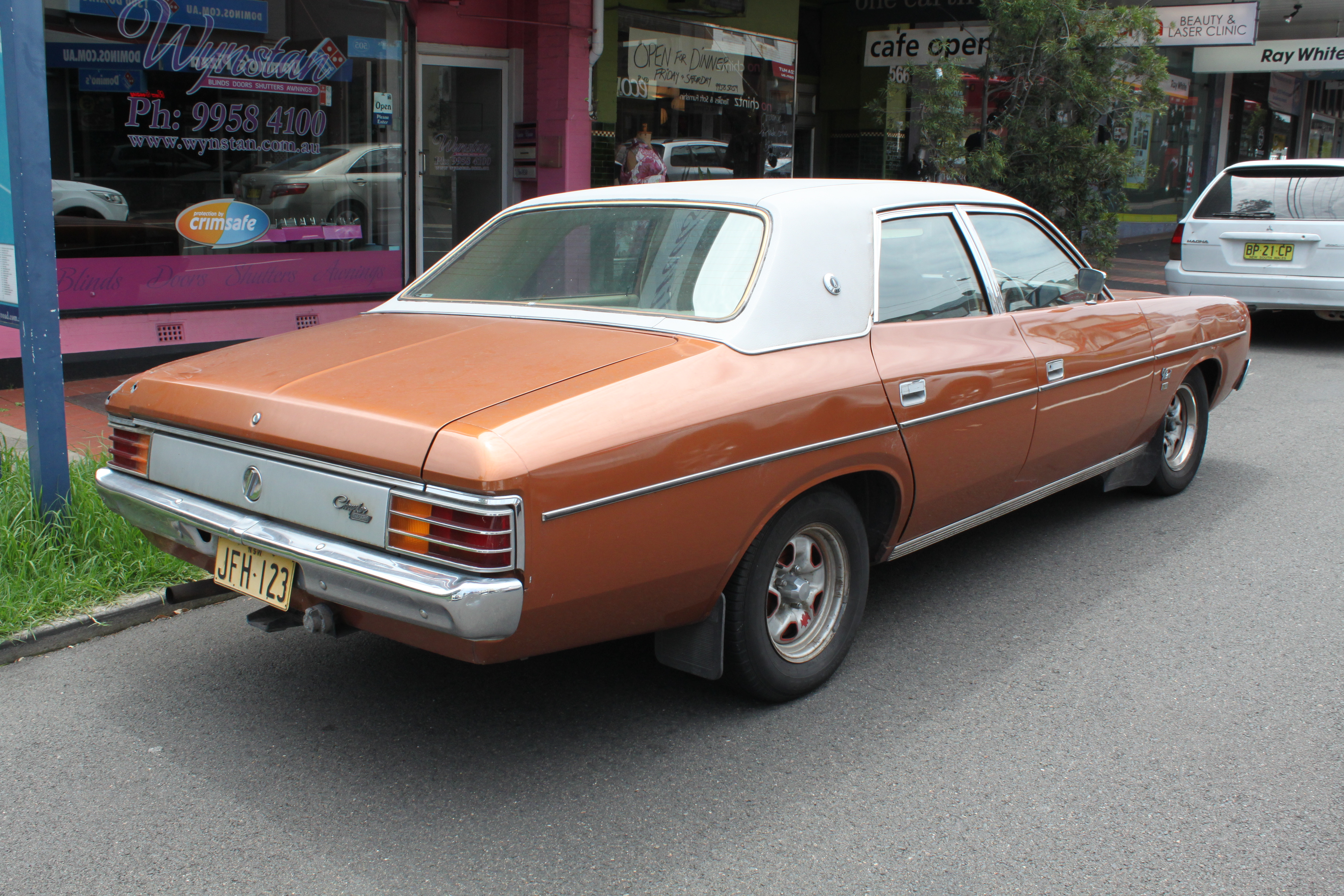
Chrysler CL Valiant sedan

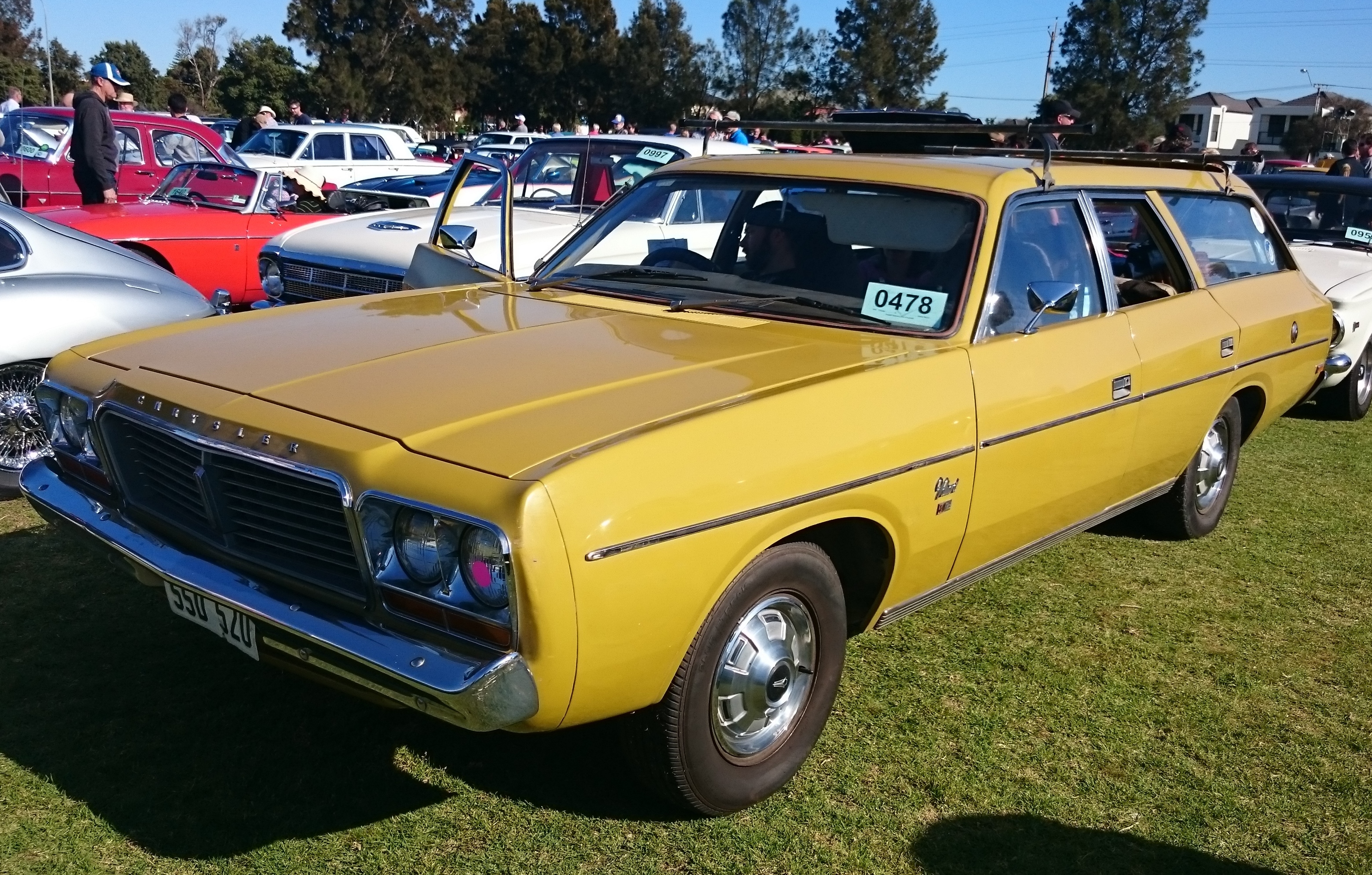
Chrysler CL Valiant wagon

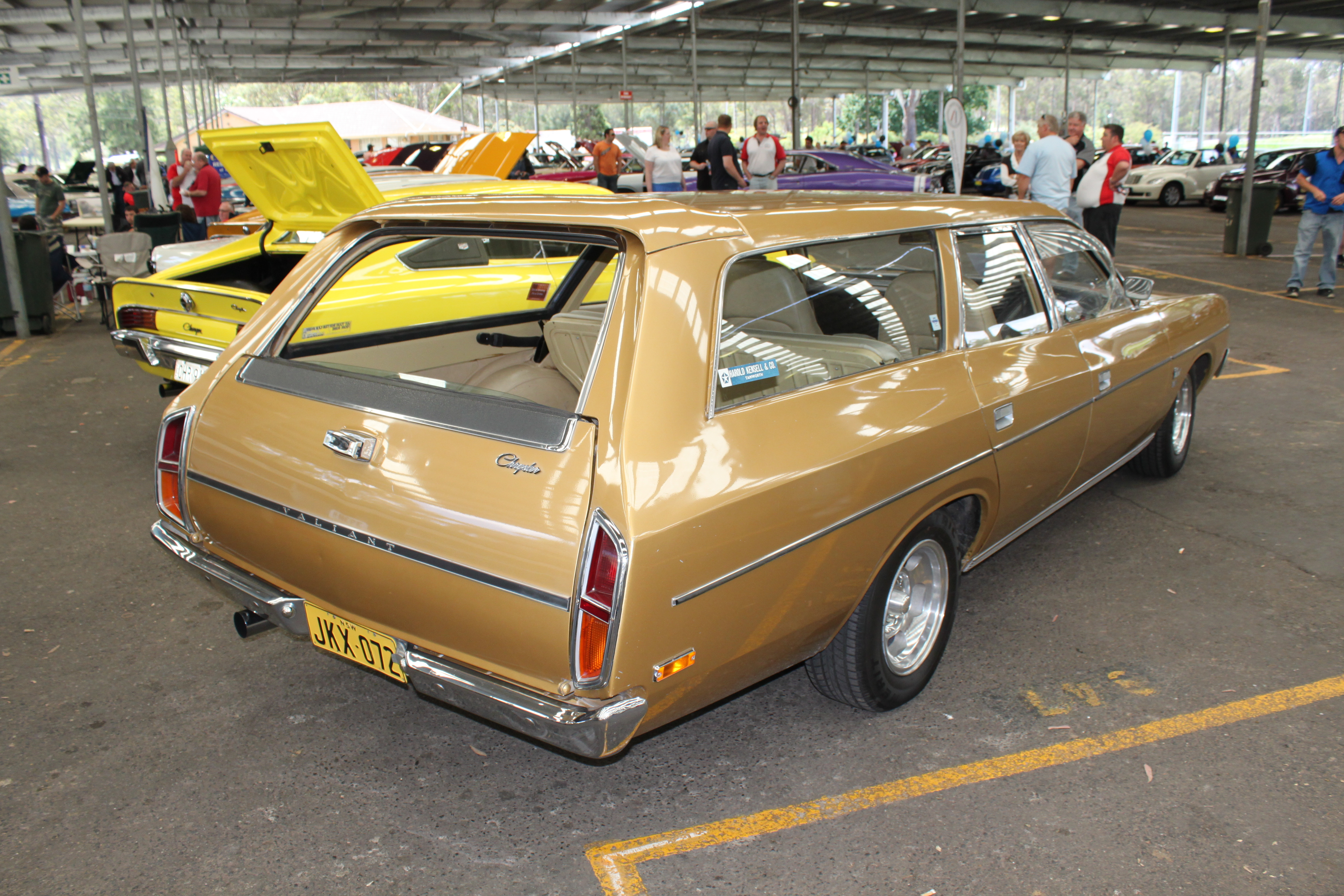
Chrysler CL Valiant wagon

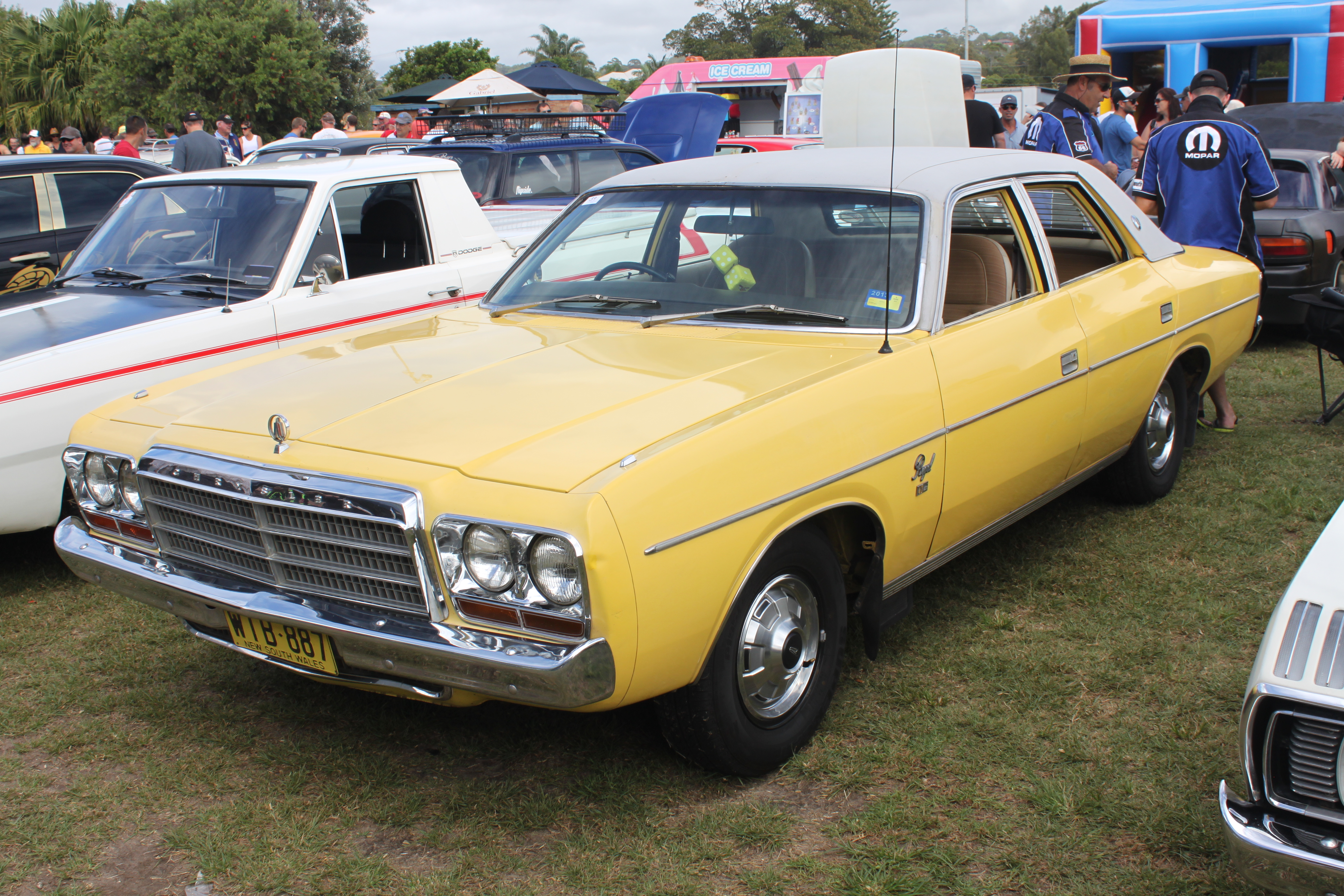
Chrysler CL Regal sedan

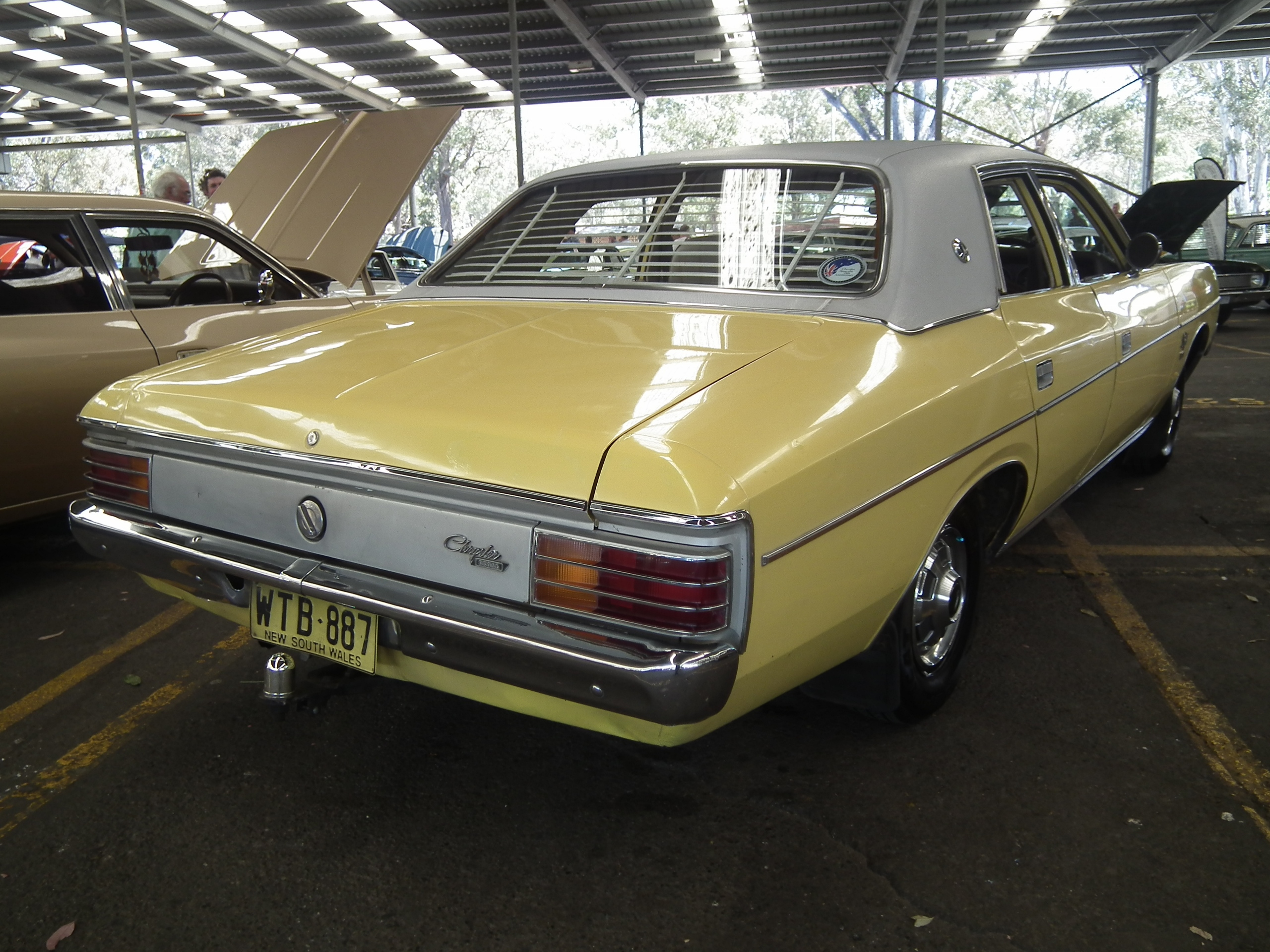
Chrysler CL Regal sedan

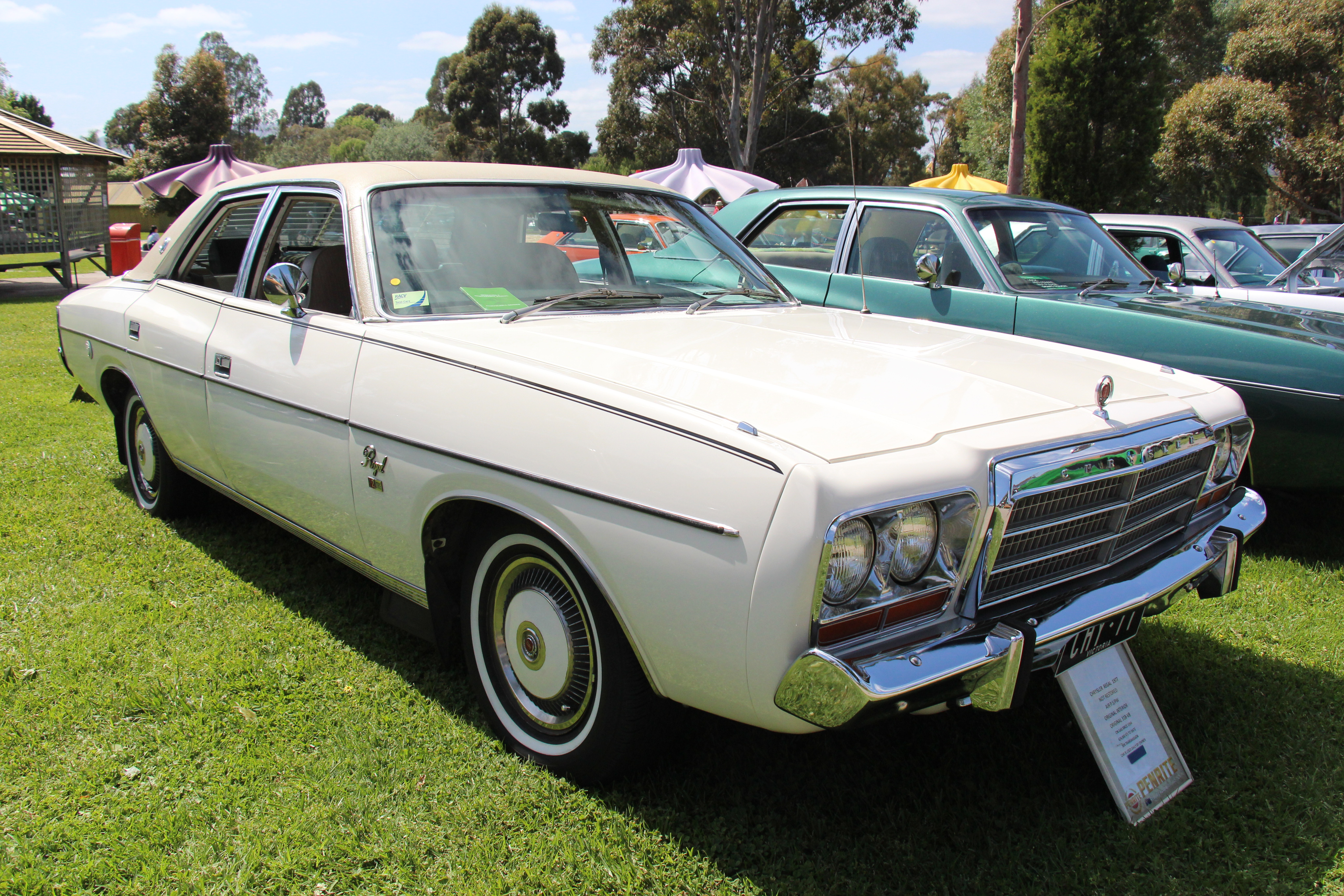
Chrysler CL Regal SE sedan

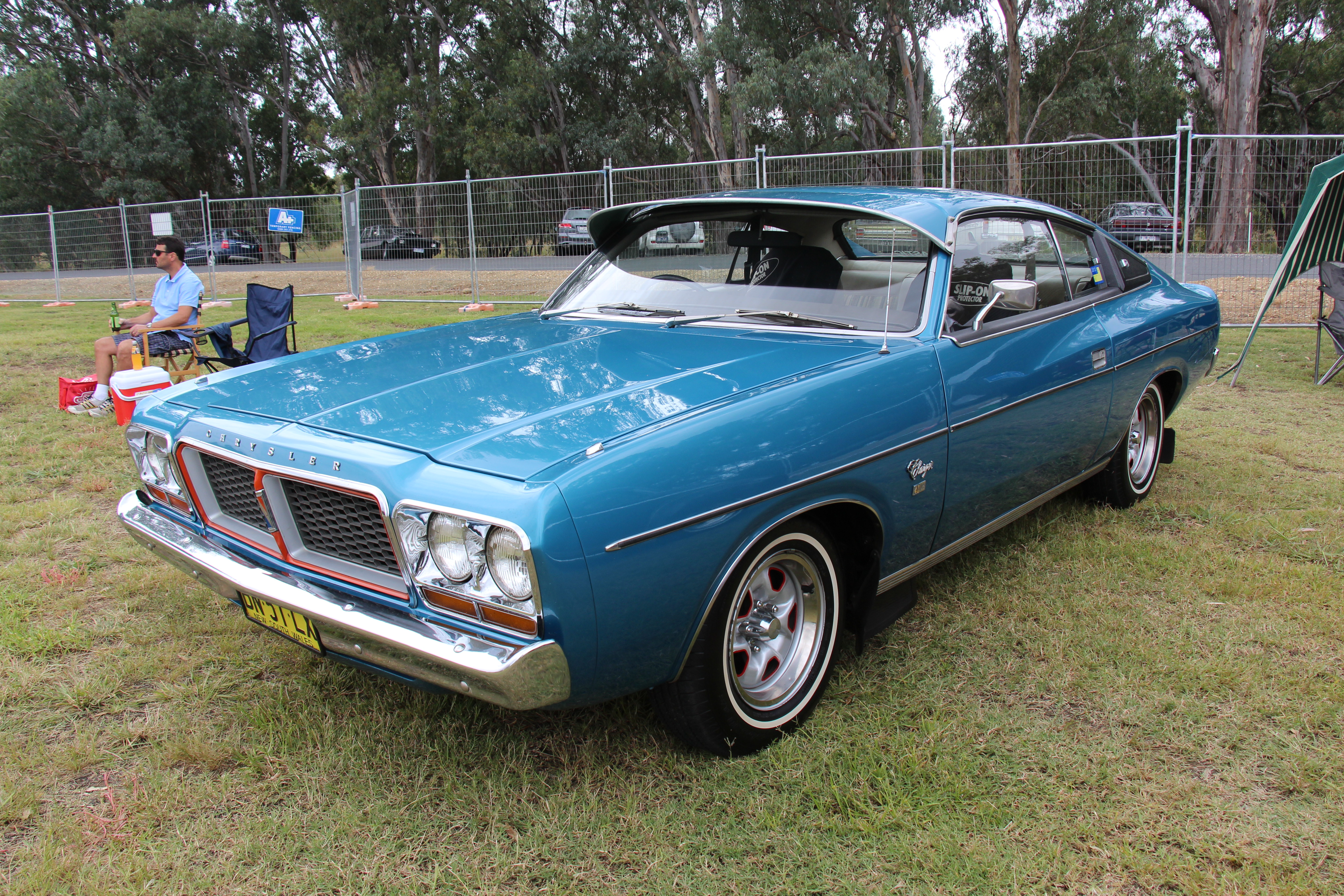
Chrysler CL Charger 770 coupe

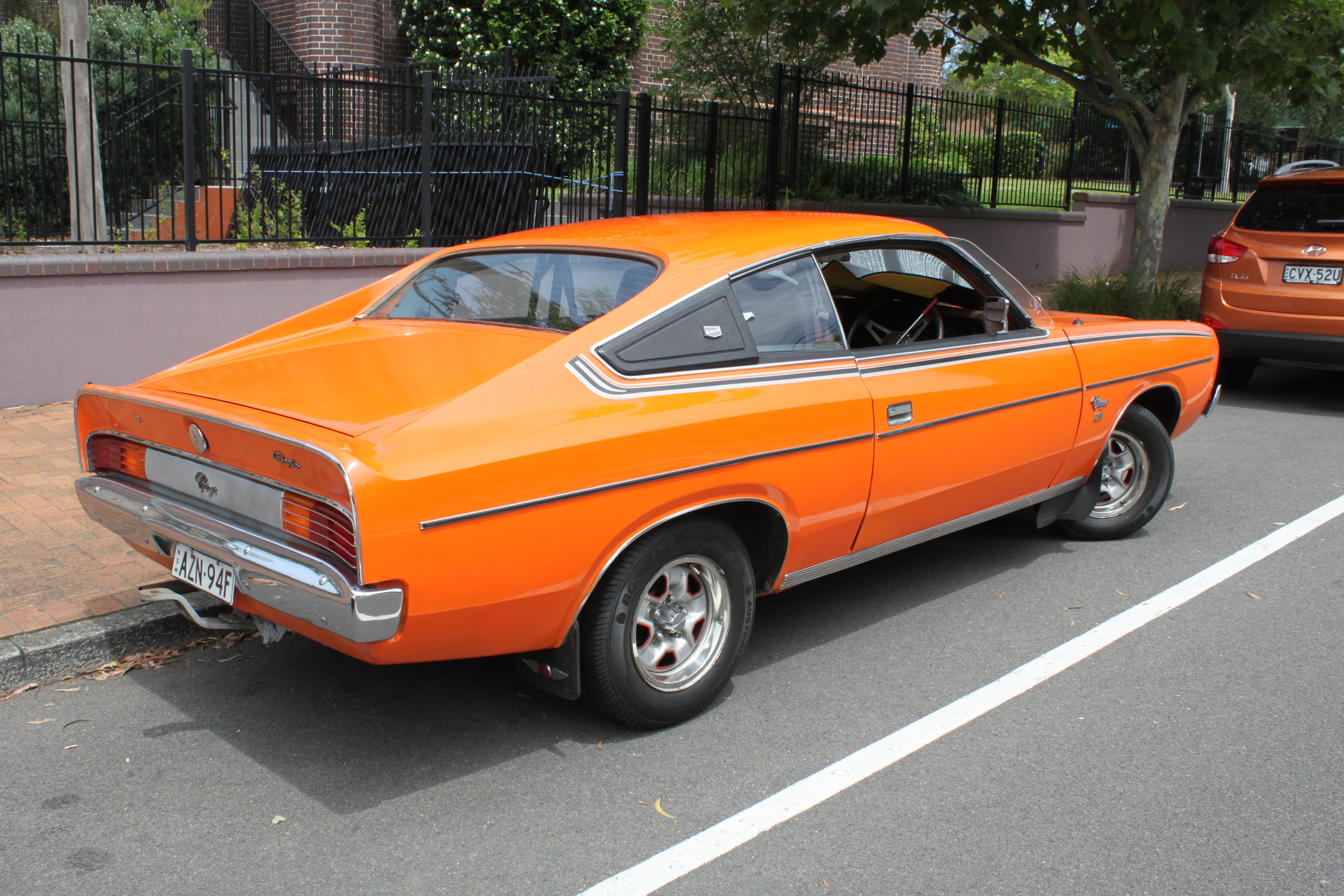
Chrysler CL Charger 770 coupe

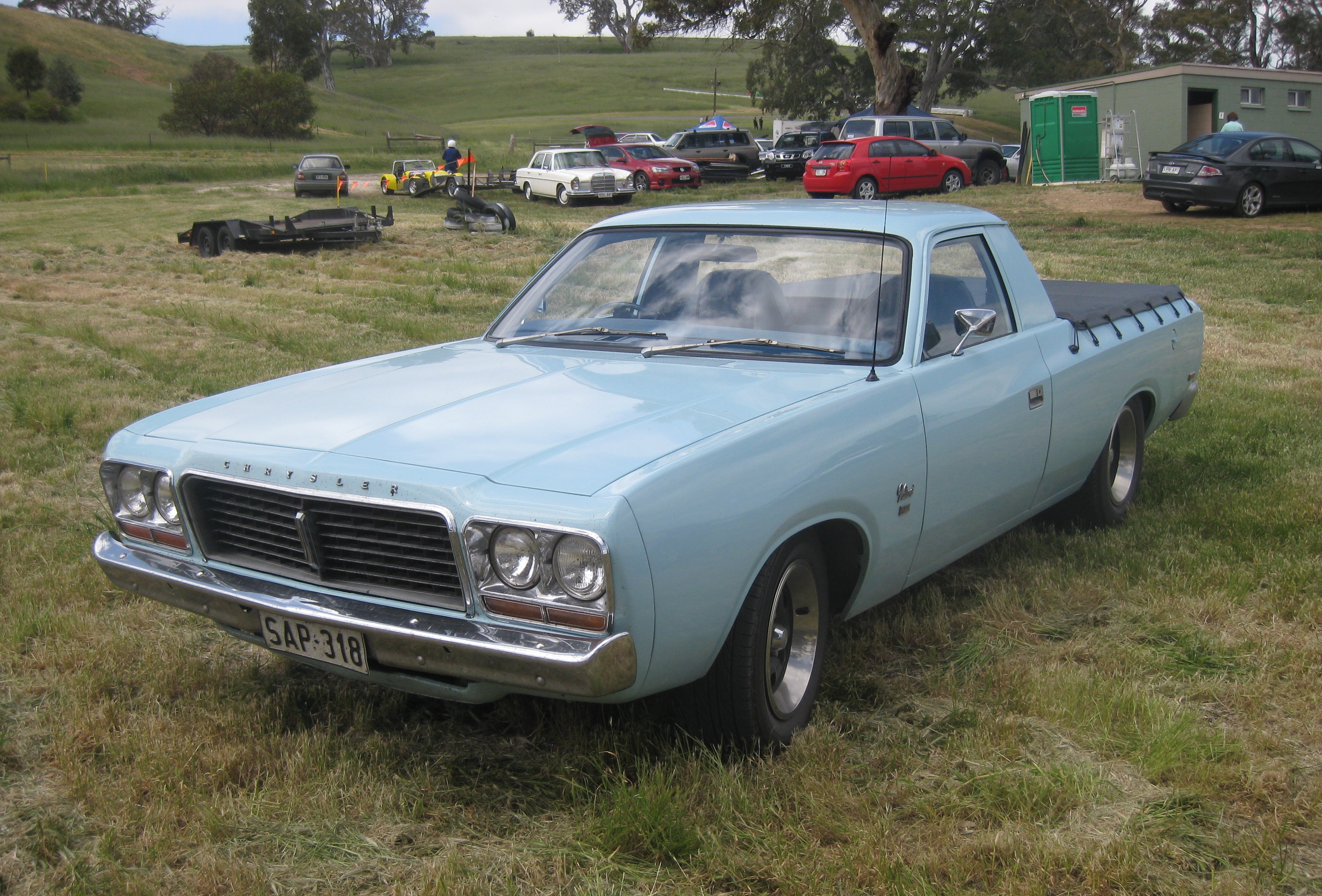
Chrysler CL Valiant utility

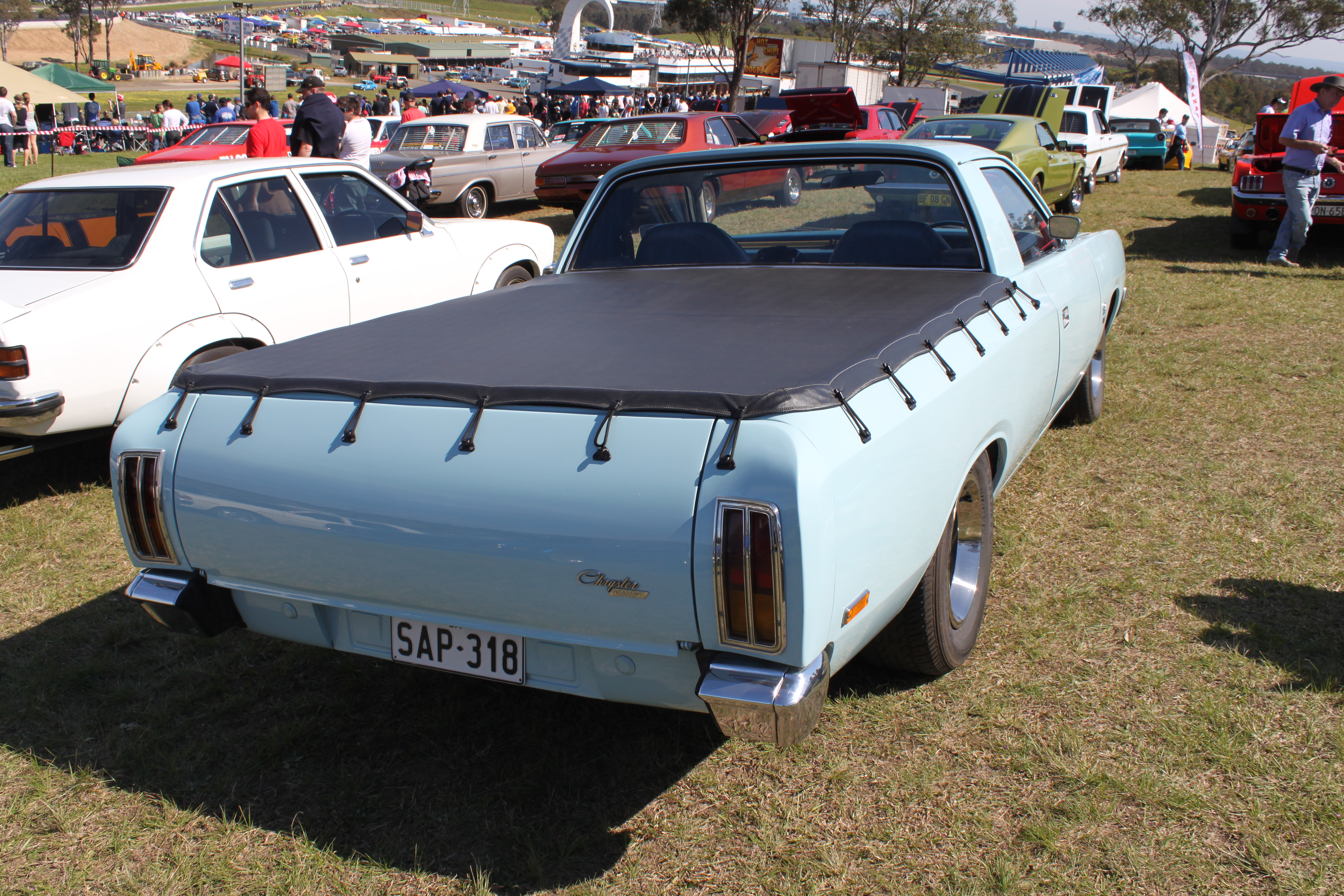
Chrysler CL Valiant utility

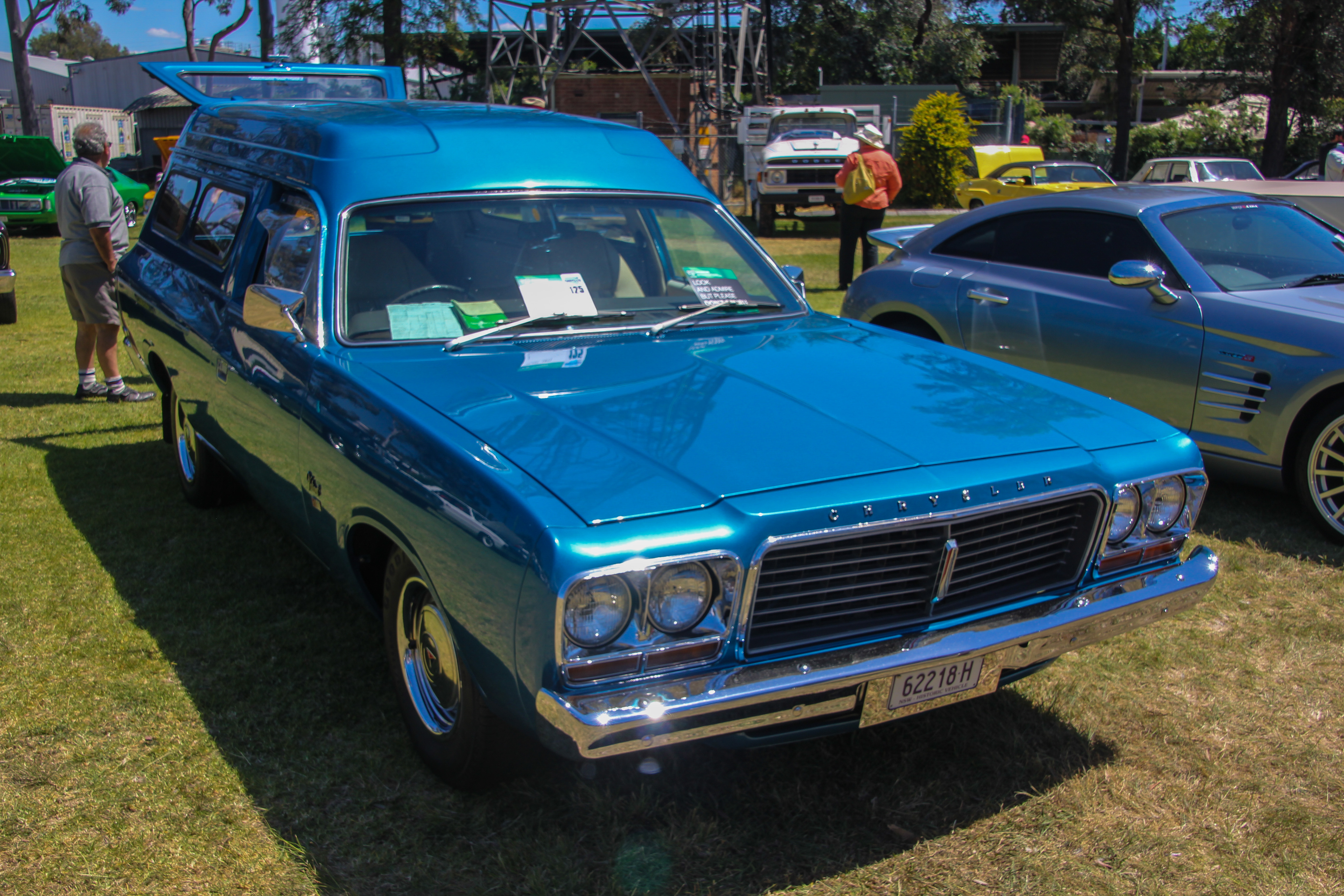
Chrysler CL Valiant panel van

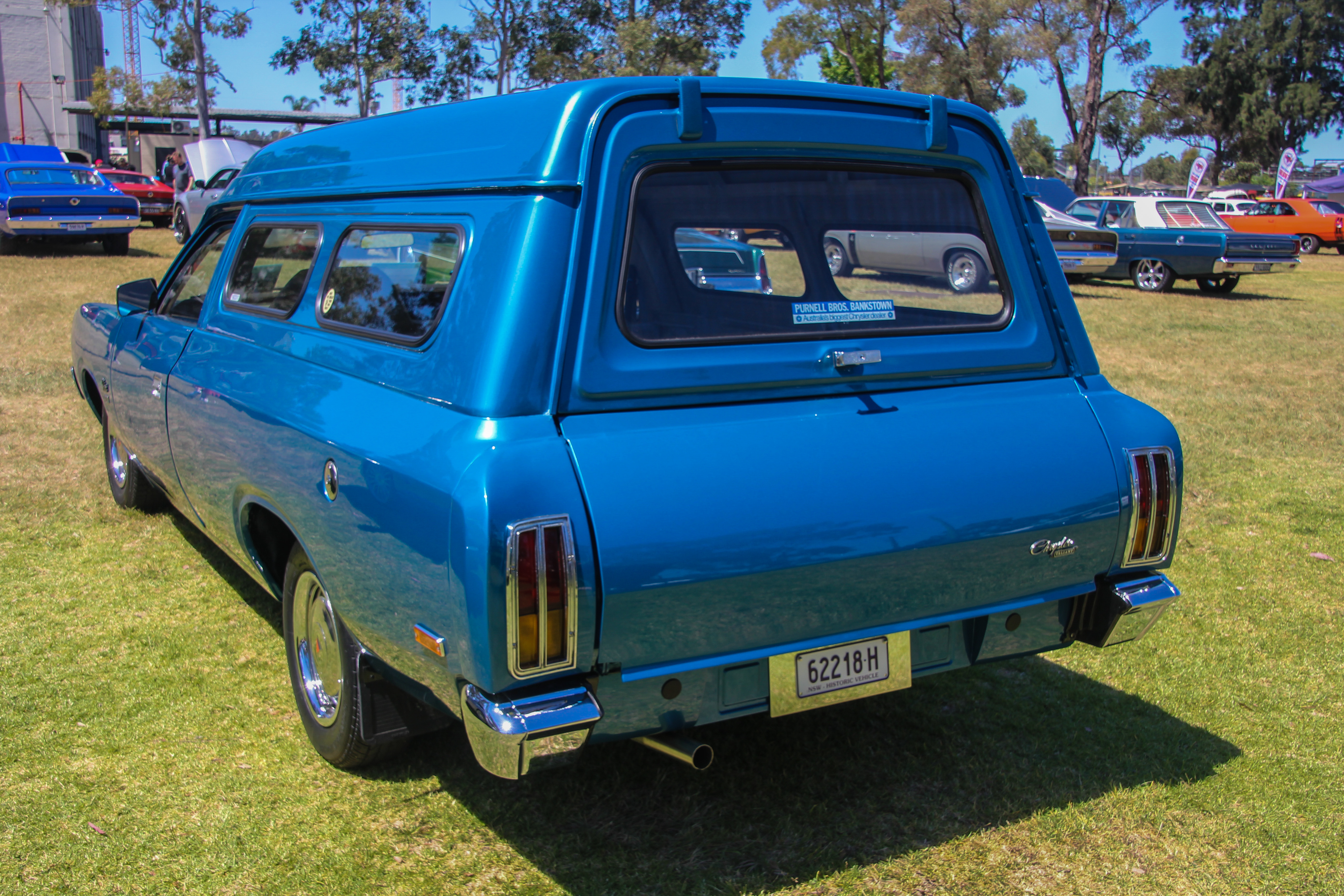
1977 Chrysler CL Valiant panel van

=== Limited edition models and option packs ===
- A limited edition Chrysler Le Baron luxury model was announced in April 1978. 400 examples were produced.
- A Charger XL model was available, but only as the K16 Police Pursuit Special with the 318 V8 engine and automatic transmission.
- A Sports Pack was available for the Panel Van and the Utility as Option A53.
- A Drifter Pack was offered for the Panel Van and Utility. Models fitted with this option were marketed under the Chrysler Drifter name.
- A Charger Drifter pack was offered as Option A34 (white) and Option A49 (Impact Orange, Sundance Yellow or Harvest Gold).
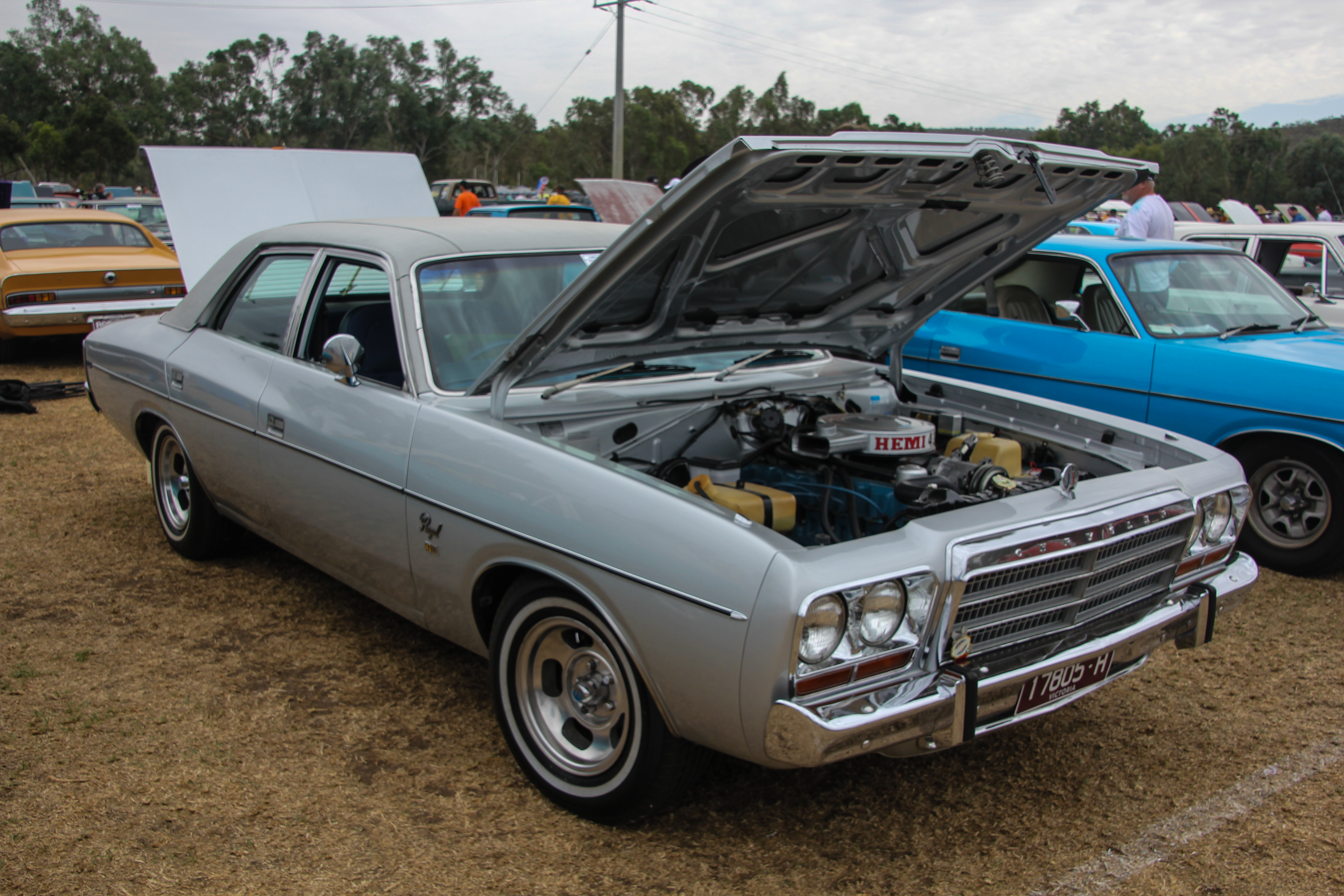
Chrysler CL Regal Le Baron sedan

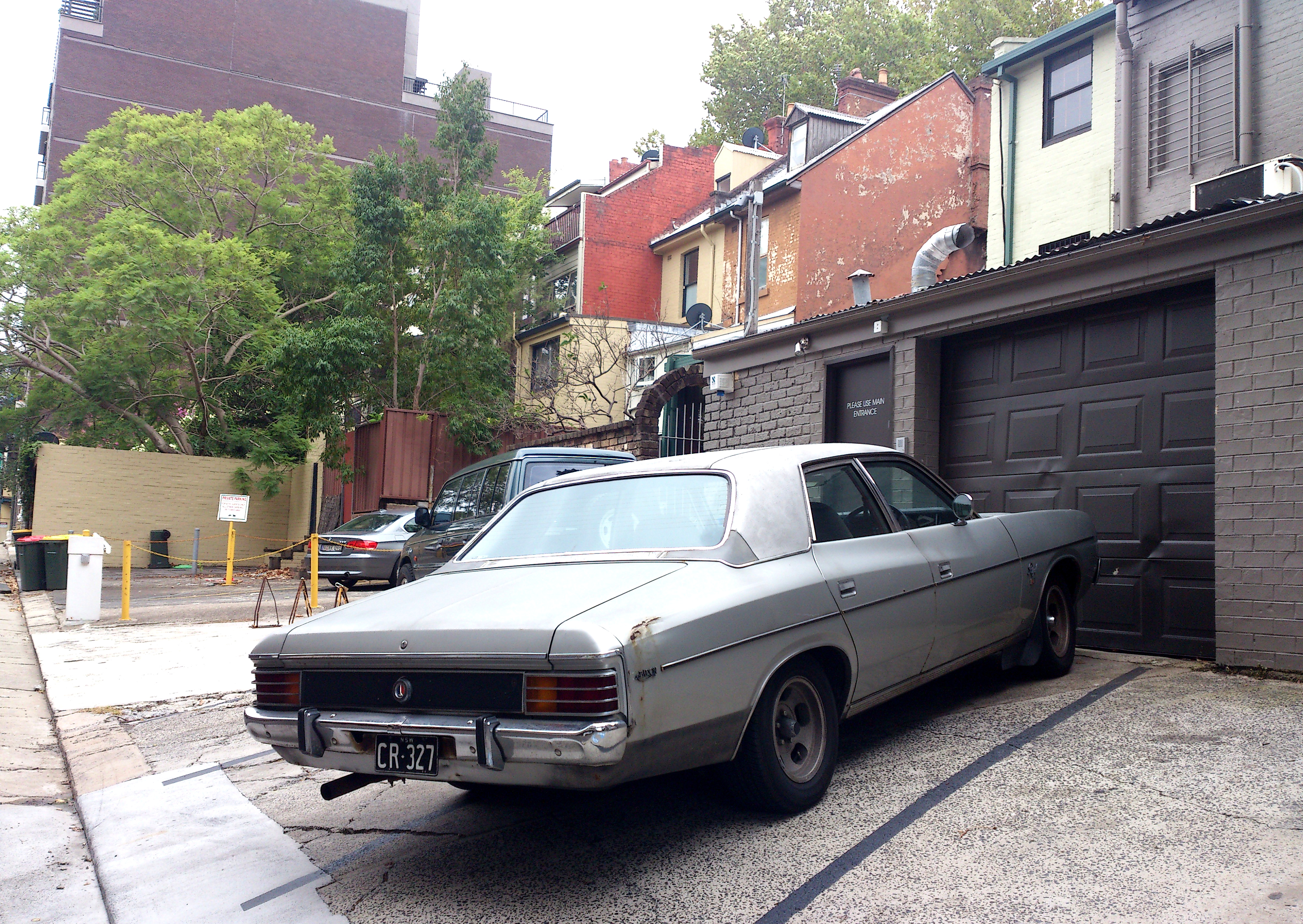
Chrysler CL Regal Le Baron sedan

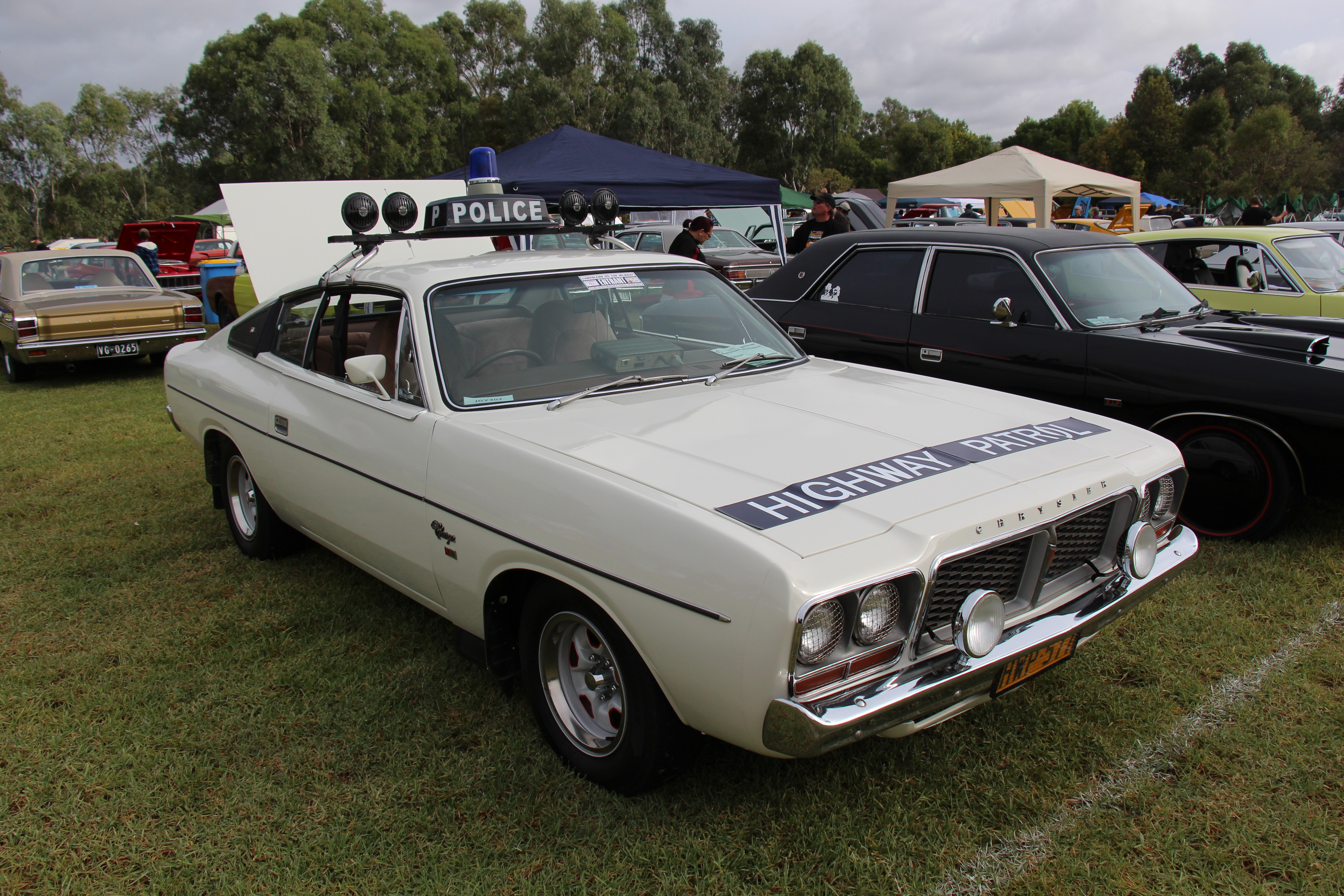
Chrysler CL Charger XL coupe (K16 Police Pursuit Special)

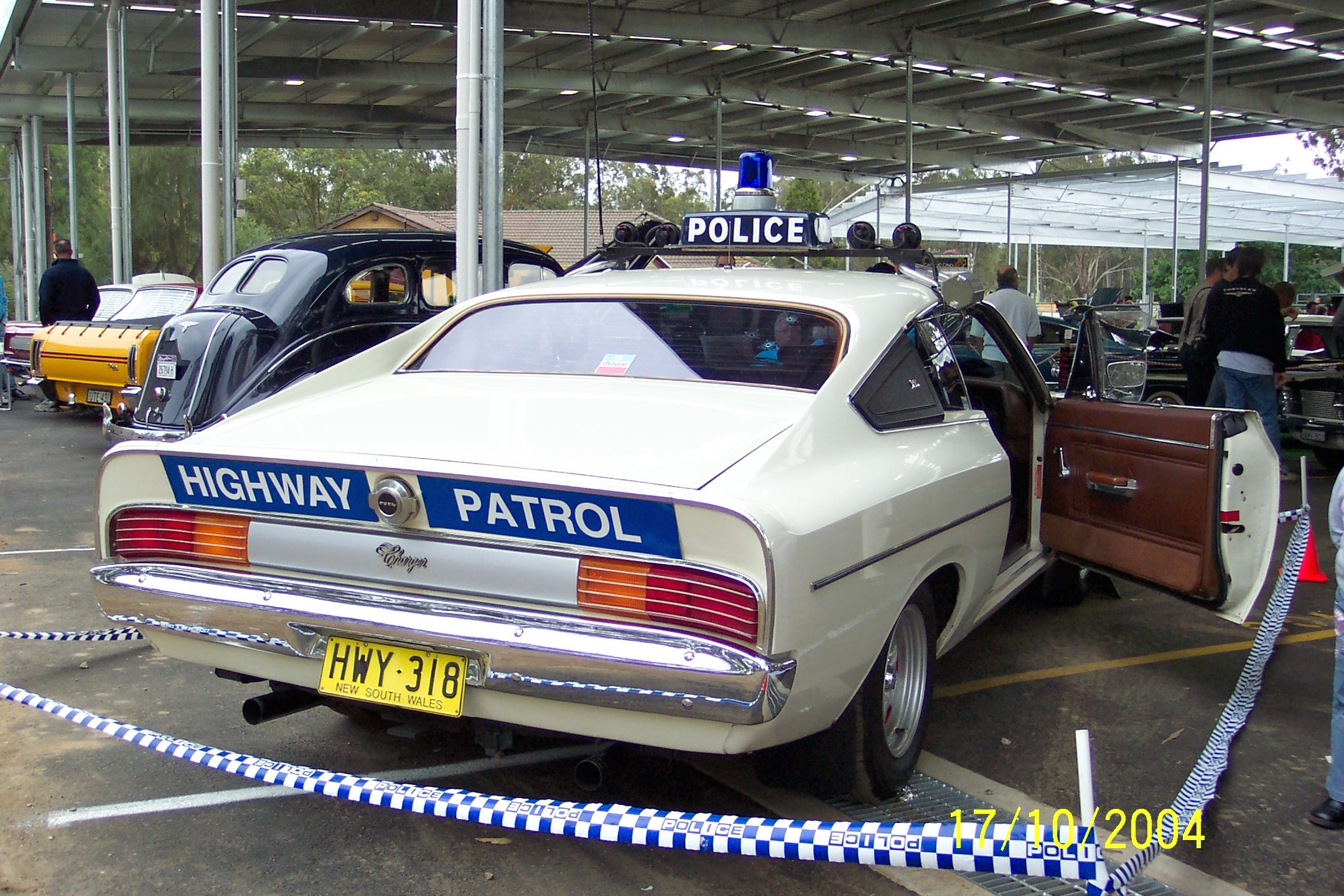
Chrysler CL Charger XL coupe (K16 Police Pursuit Special)

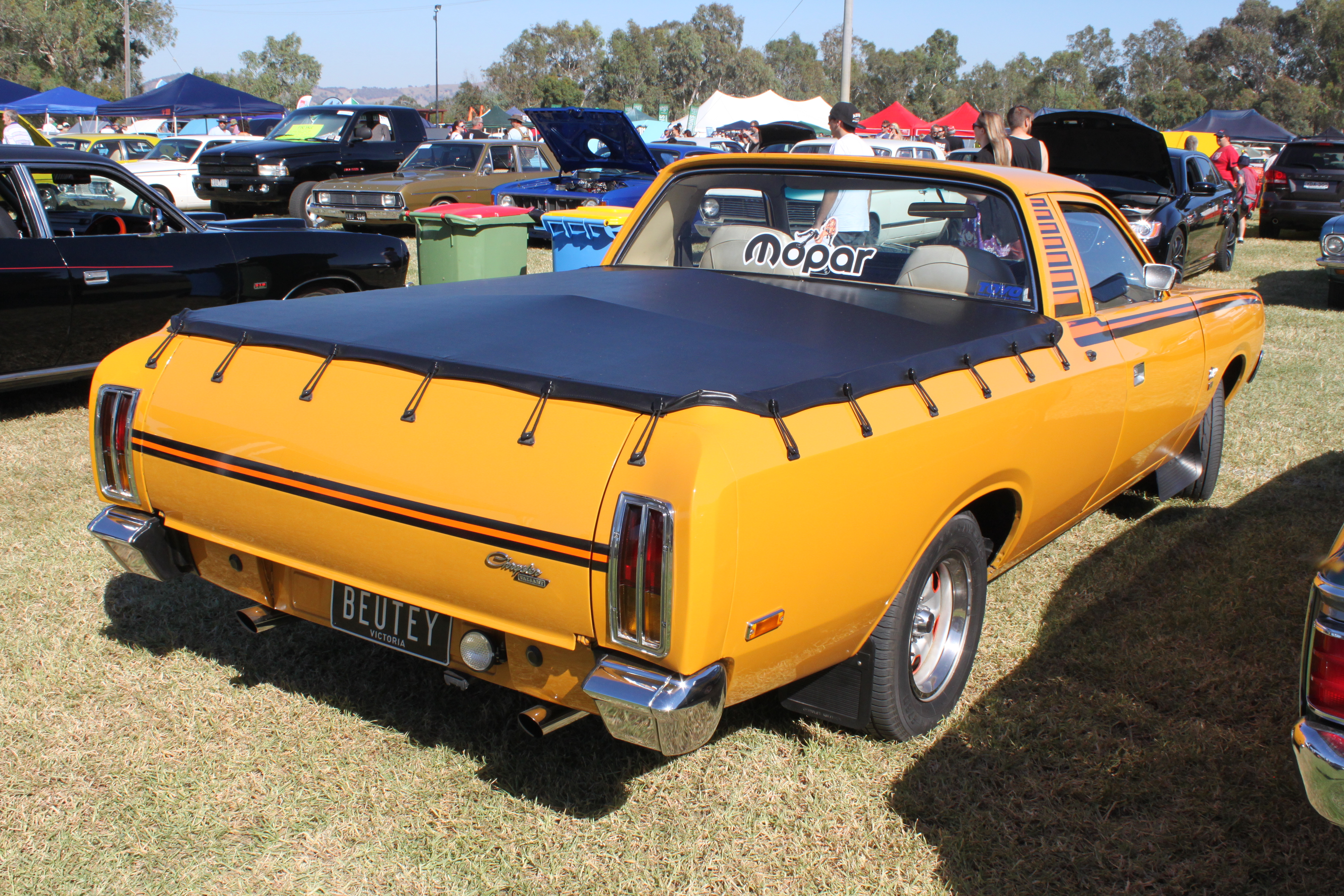
Chrysler CL Valiant utility with Sports Pack

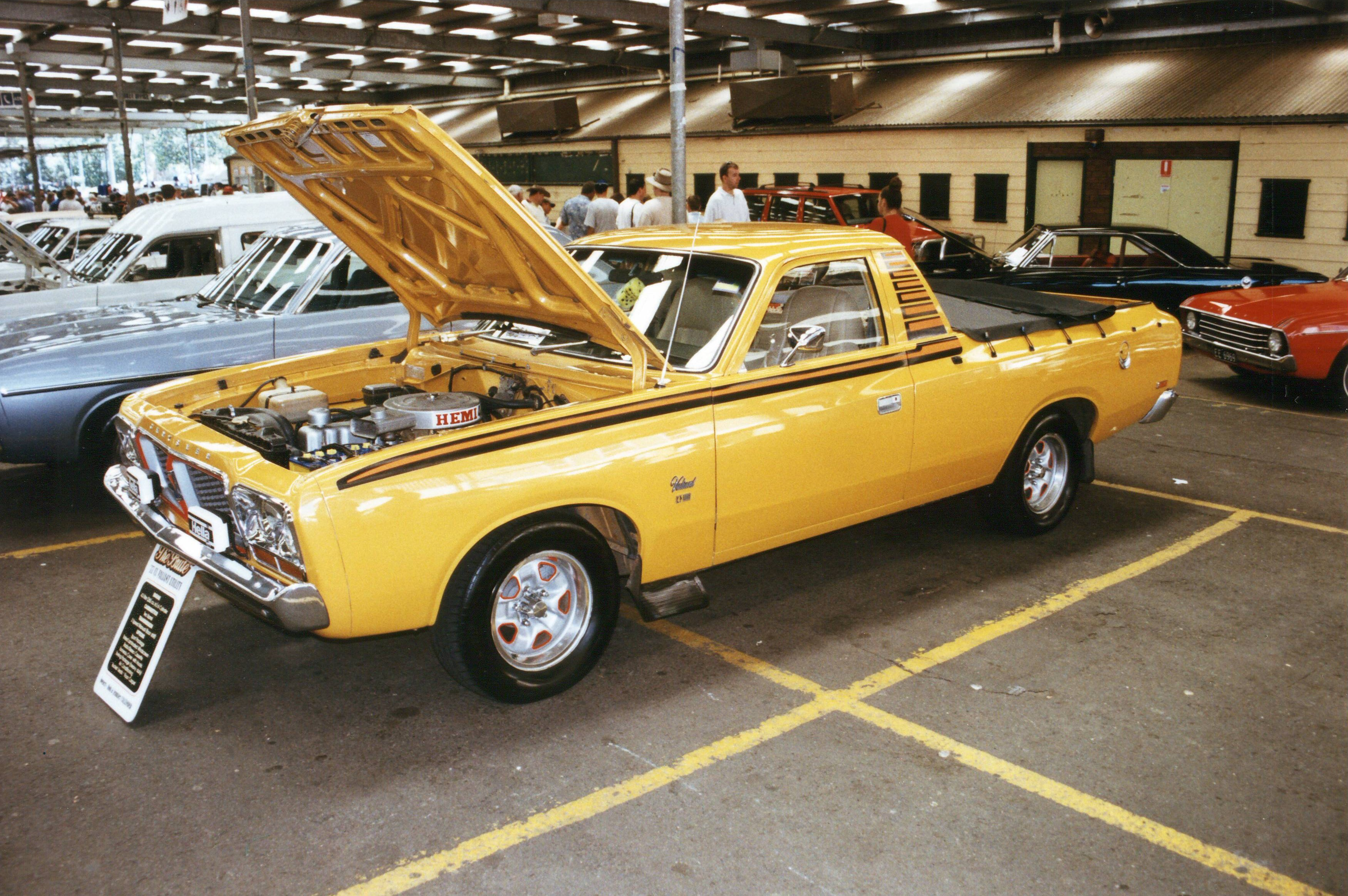
Chrysler CL Valiant utility with Sports Pack

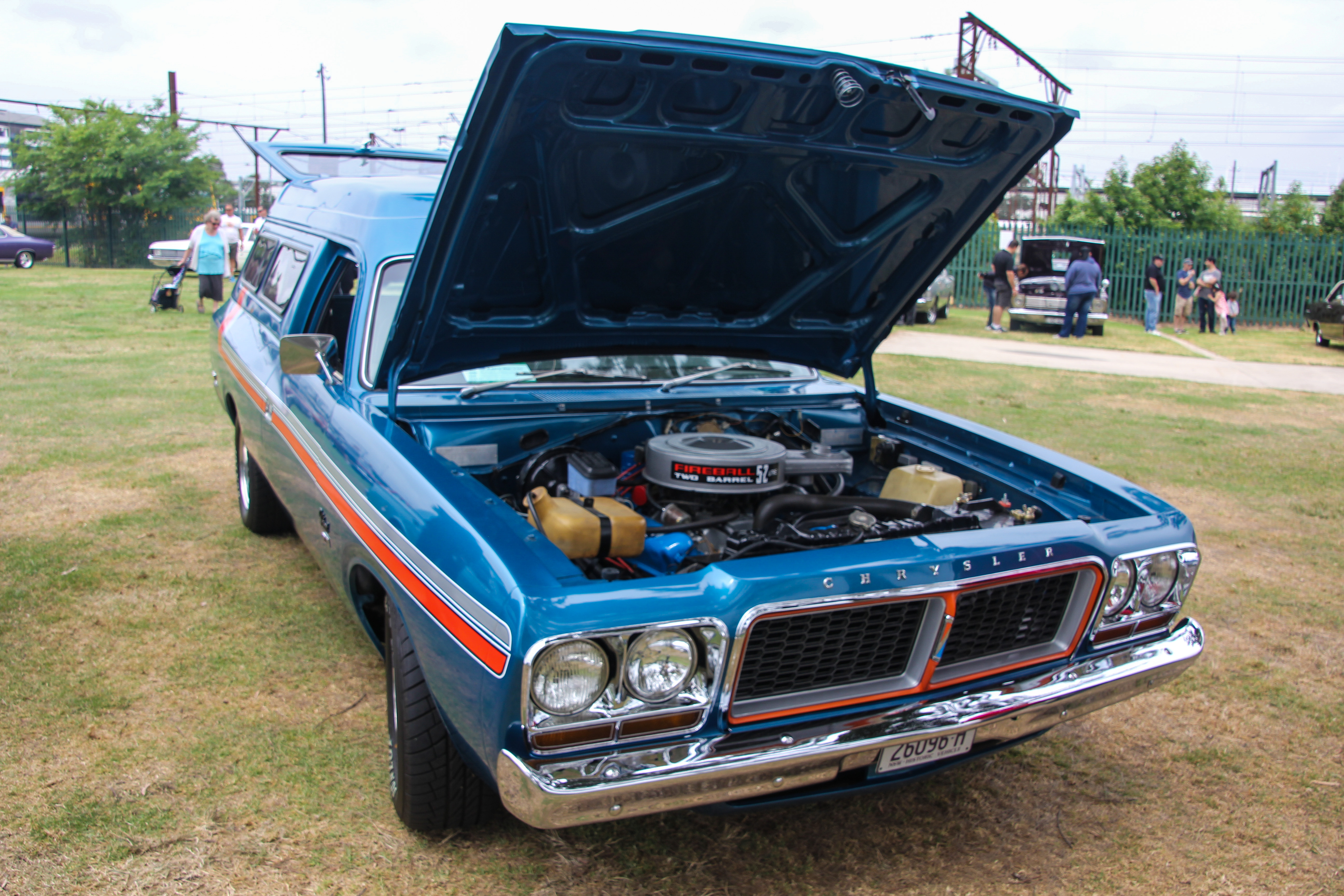
Chrysler CL Valiant panel van with Sports Pack

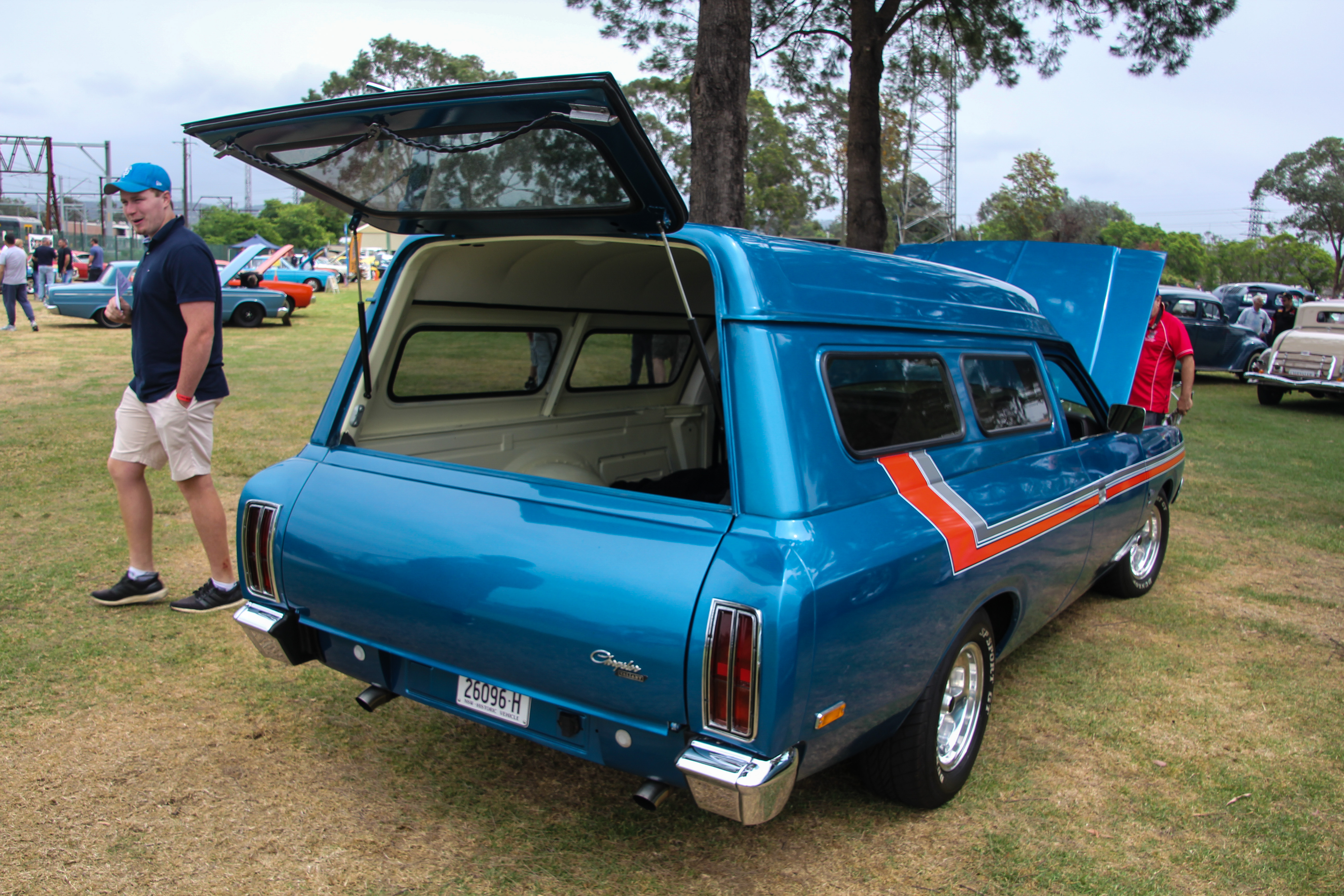
Chrysler CL Valiant panel van with Sports Pack

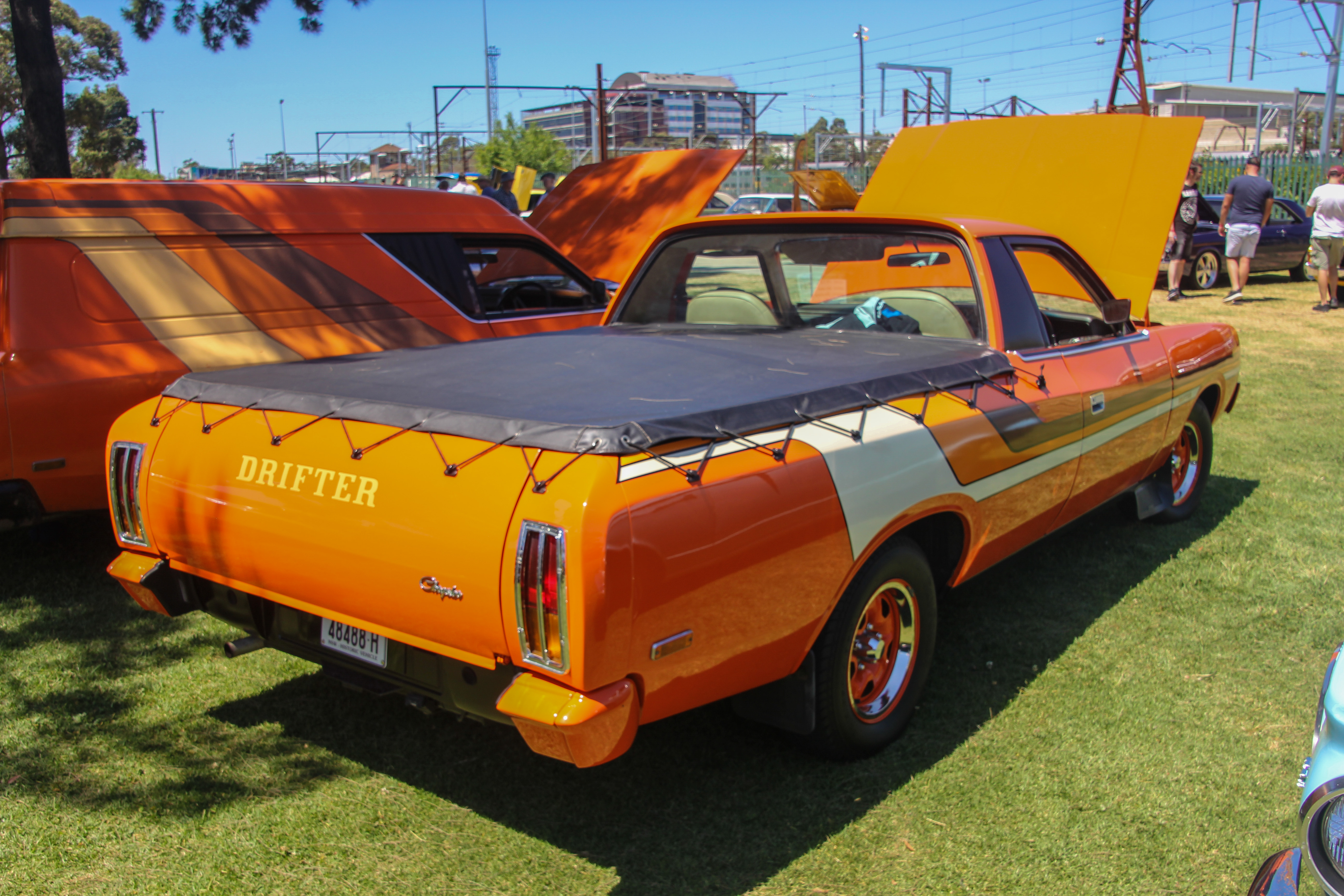
Chrysler CL Valiant utility with Drifter pack

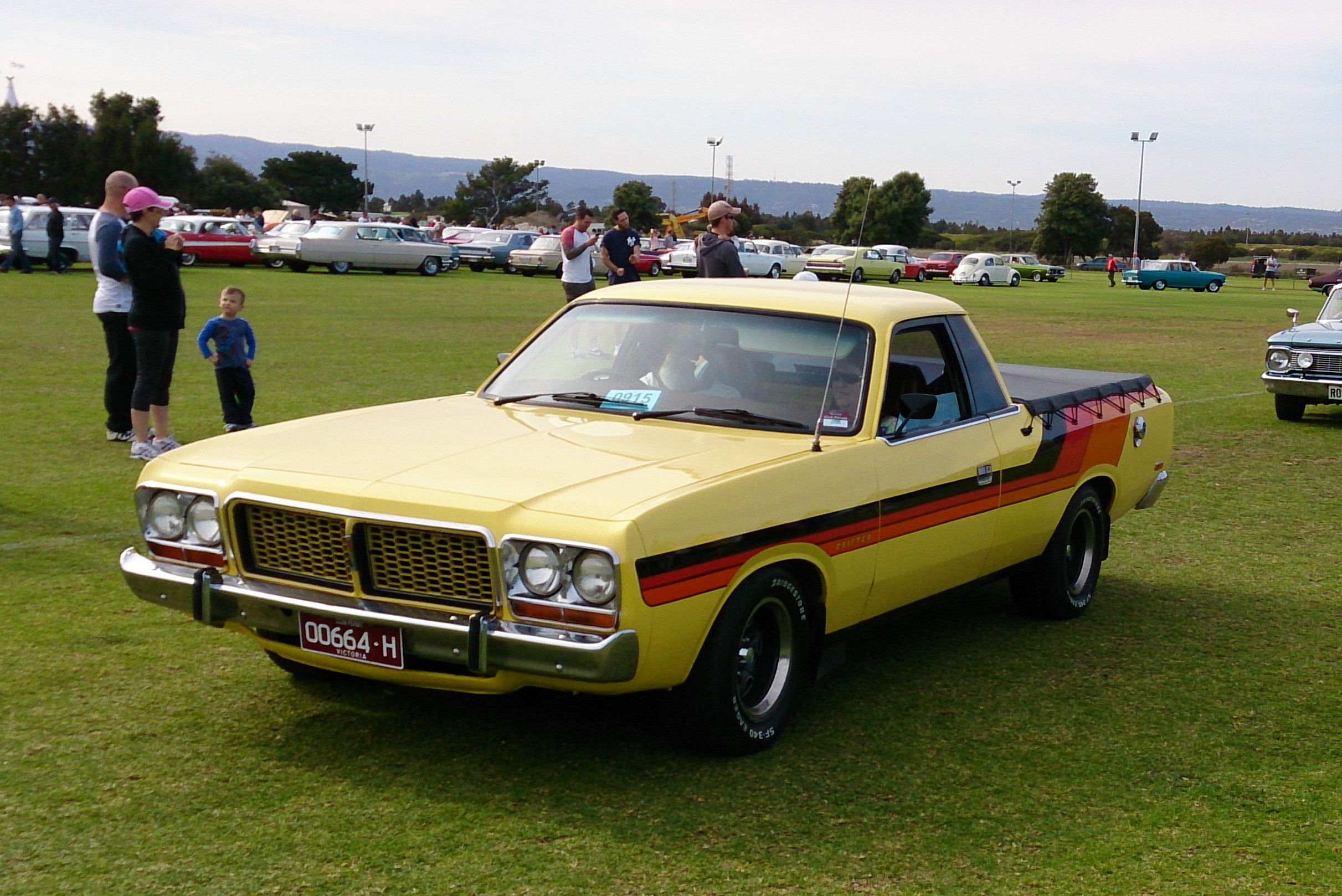
Chrysler CL Valiant utility with Drifter pack

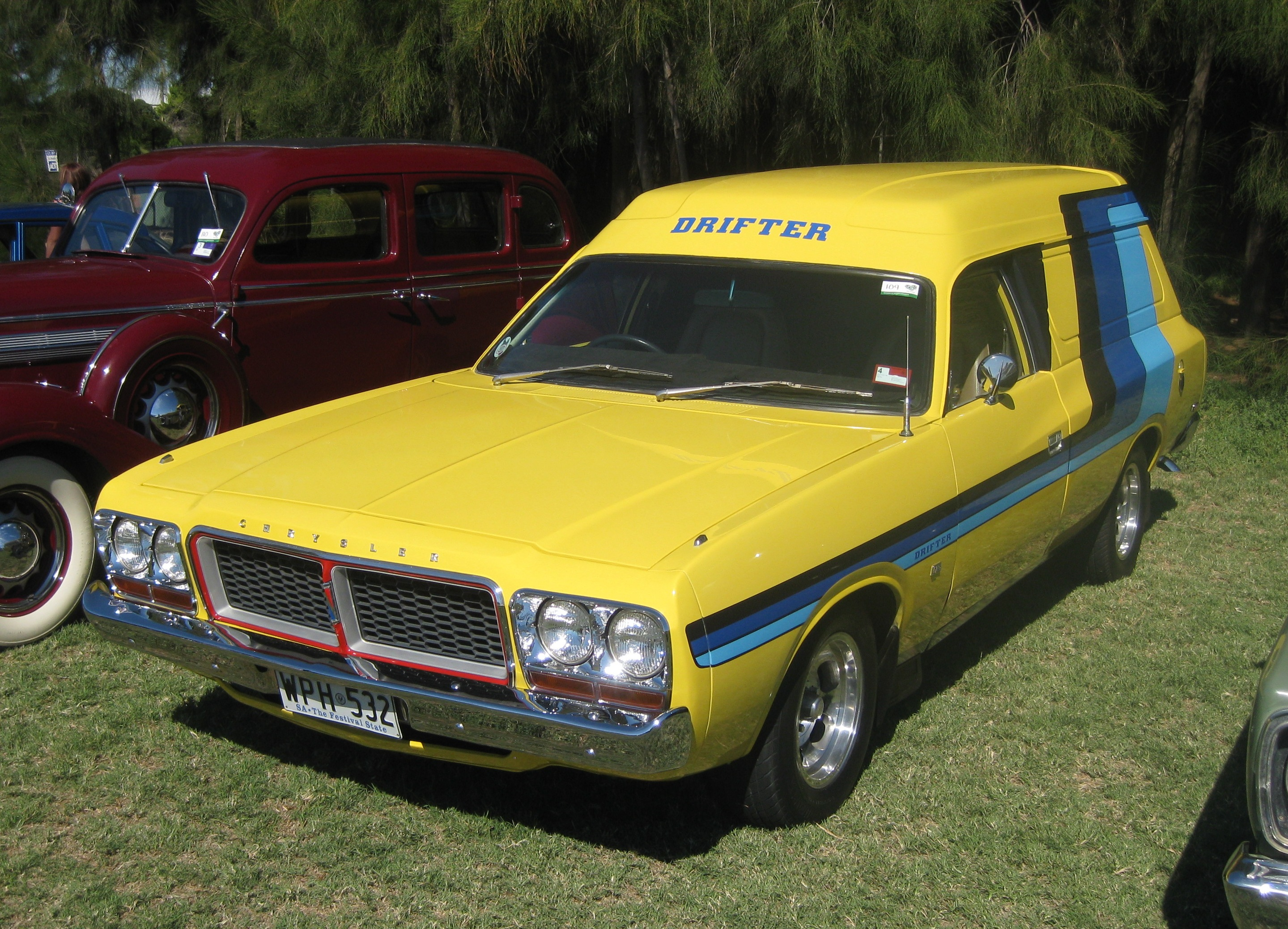
Chrysler CL Valiant panel van with Drifter pack

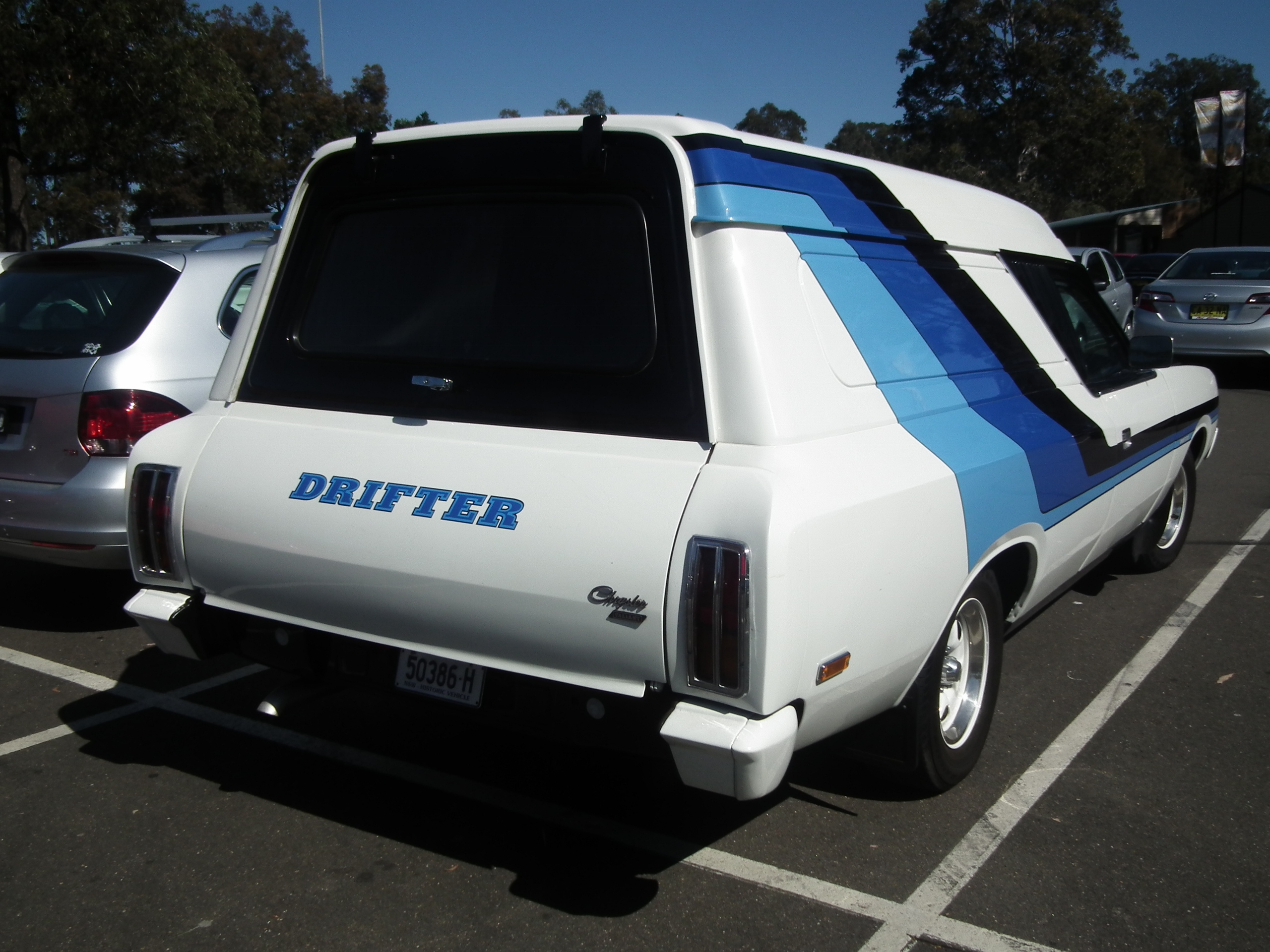
Chrysler CL Valiant panel van with Drifter pack

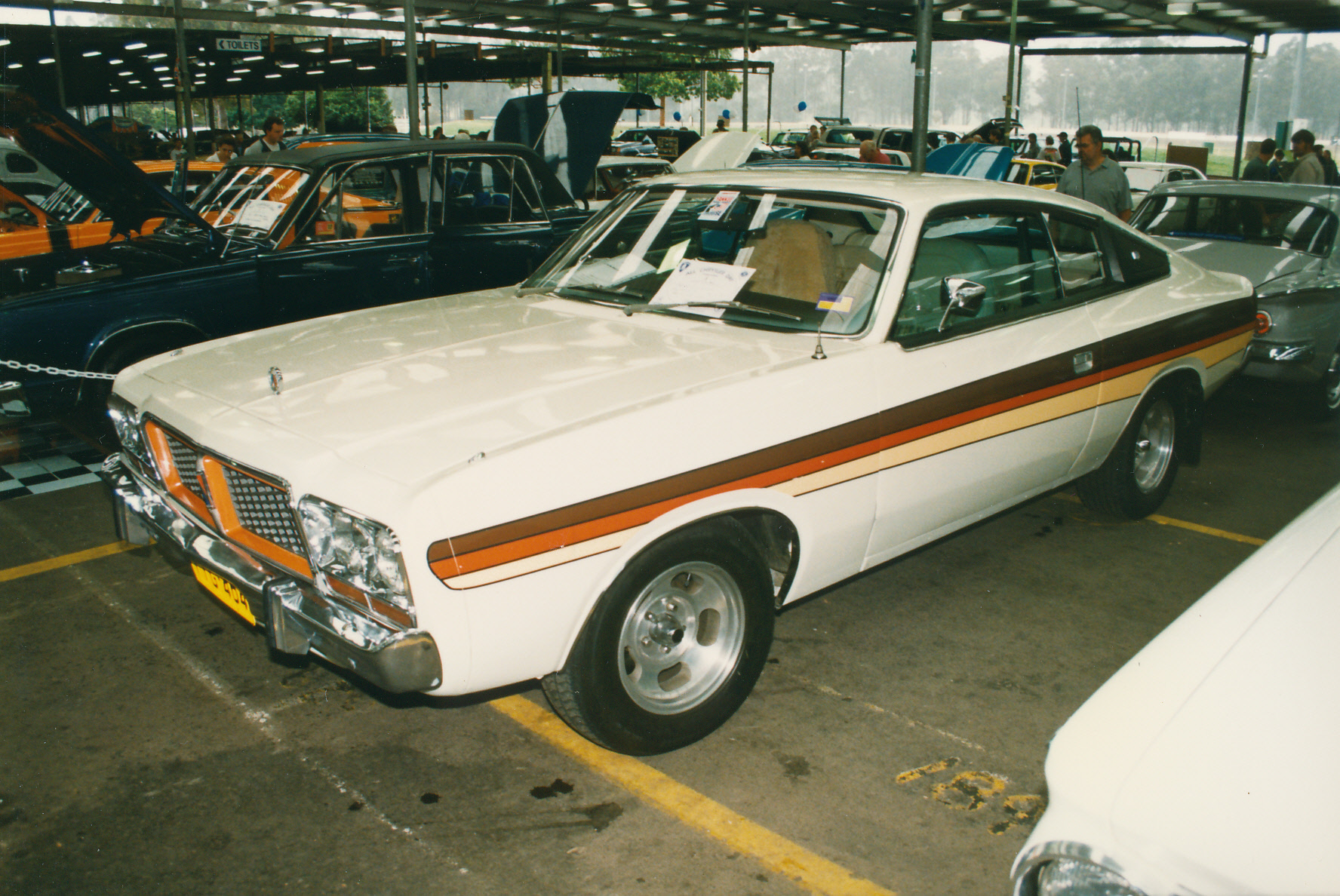
Chrysler CL Charger coupe with Drifter pack

== Engines and transmissions ==
Three engines were offered:

- 245 cu in (4.0 L) I6
- 265 cu in (4.3 L) I6
- 318 cu in (5.2 L) V8

Four transmissions were offered:

- 3 speed manual
- 4 speed manual
- 3 speed Borg-Warner 35 automatic (6 cylinder models only)
- 3 speed TorqueFlite A904 automatic (V8 powered models only)

== Production and replacement ==
32,672 CL models were built prior to the replacement of the CL by the Chrysler Valiant (CM) in 1978.

=== New Zealand ===
The CL was the last Australian Valiant series assembled by Todd Motors in New Zealand. Only the Regal and Regal SE were offered. The Regal SE was the first car to be assembled in New Zealand with air conditioning as standard.

=== South Africa ===
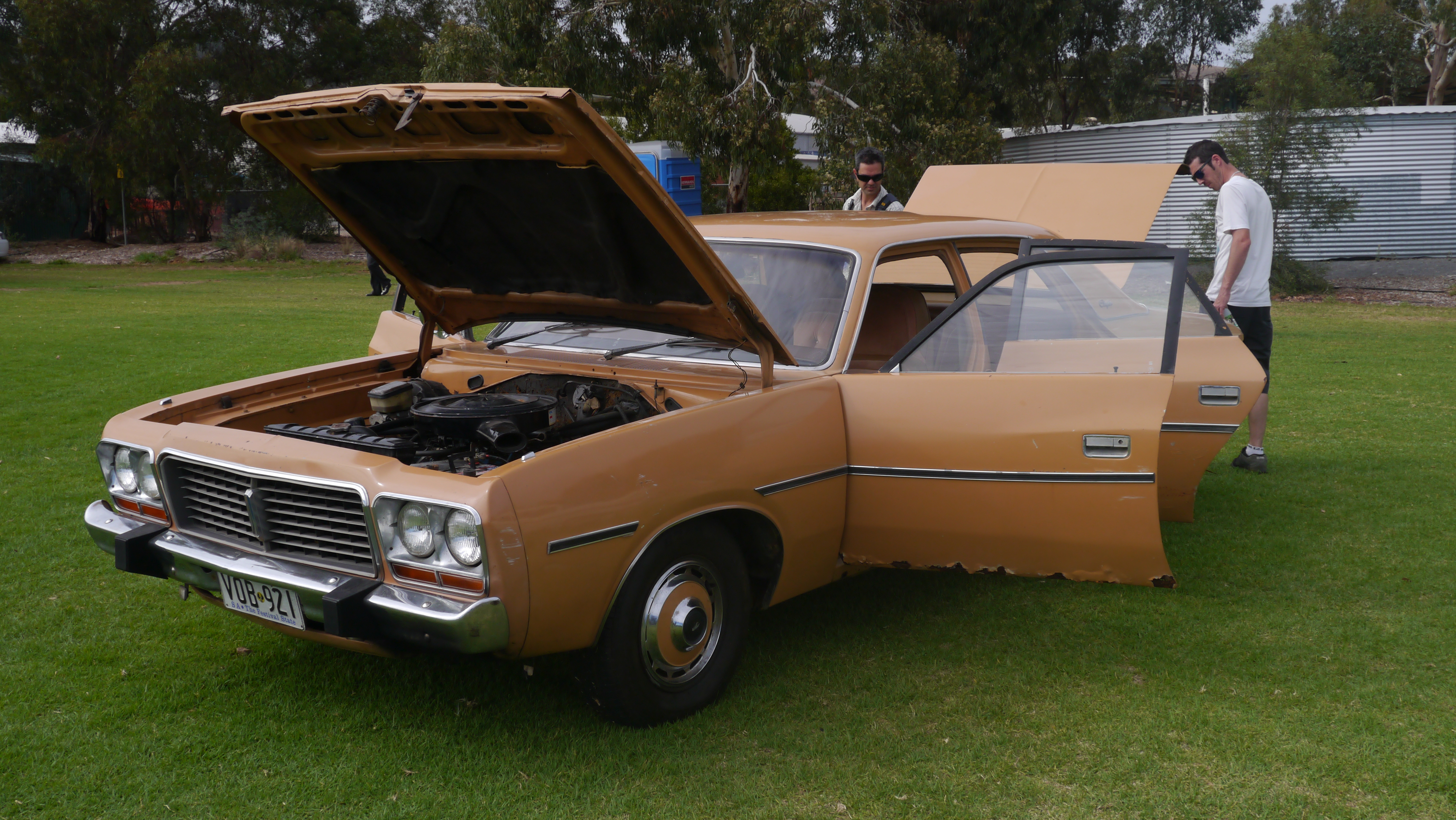
South-African Chrysler SE

In 1978 a model of the CL Regal was introduced in South Africa for local assembly. These cars came equipped with a locally-built four-barrel 225 slant-six producing 120 kW (163 PS; 161 hp). In spite of the engine's impressive "Charger-Power" name, this only sufficed for a top speed of 140.5 km/h (87 mph) in a period road test. While the performance came in for some criticism, fuel economy and brakes received higher marks. The SE only came as a fully equipped model, with the interior and suspension having received some fettling in Detroit prior to Sigma finishing development in South Africa.
