= List of Chrysler vehicles =

The American car company Chrysler has produced many different models of cars under the brand name. In addition to Chrysler models built in the United States, the list also includes vehicles manufactured in other countries and cars designed by other independent corporations that were rebranded for Chrysler. "Chrysler Australia" was the Australian division of Chrysler, and cars made by Chrysler Australia were sold mainly in their country of origin. The same goes for cars marked "Europe" and "Canada".

== Current production vehicles ==
Name	Introd.	Curr.	Facelift	Gen.	Image
Vans
Pacifica (Note: Luxury minivan. Name previously used on a mid-size crossover from 2004 to 2008.)	2017	2017	2027	1st	
Grand Caravan (Note: Lower cost version of the Pacifica, lacking the 2021 and 2027 facelifts. Called Voyager in the United States until 2026. Sold exclusively in Canada.)	1988 (Nameplate); 2020 (Reintroduction)	2020	–	6th	

== Former production vehicles ==
=== United States ===
Name	First	Last	Image
300	2005	2023	
200	2011	2017	
Sebring	1995	2010	
PT Cruiser	2001	2010	
Crossfire	2004	2008	
Neon (Note: Marketed in Europe, Mexico, Canada, Japan, Egypt, Australia, and South America. Also commercialised under the Dodge and Plymouth brands.)	1992	2005	
300M	1999	2004	
Concorde	1993	2004	
Prowler	2001	2002	
LHS	1994	1997	
LHS	1999	2001	
Cirrus	1995	2000	
300 letter series	1955	1965	
300 non-letter series	1962	1971 (Note: Briefly revived in 1979.)	
Airflow	1934	1937	
Airstream	1935	1937	
Conquest	1987	1989	
Cordoba	1975	1983	
E-Class	1983	1984	
Executive	1983	1986	
Fifth Avenue	1984	1989	
Imperial	1926	1954	
Imperial	1990	1993	
Imperial Parade Phaeton	1952	1952	
Laser (Note: Rebrand of the Dodge Daytona.)	1984	1986	
LeBaron	1977	1995	
Newport	1940	1941	
Newport	1950	1950	
Newport	1961	1981	
New Yorker	1939	1996	
New Yorker Fifth Avenue	1983	1983	
New Yorker Fifth Avenue	1990	1993	
Royal	1933	1950	
Saratoga	1939	1953	
Saratoga	1957	1960	
Saratoga	1961	1966	
Shadow (Note: Originally a Dodge model.) (Note: Name given in the country where it was commercialised as a "Chrysler" although its country of origin may have been different.)	1988	1994	
Six	1924	1935	
Spirit	1990	1995	
Town and Country	1941	1977	
Turbine Car (Note: Experimental gas turbine–powered car.)	1963	1963	
Windsor	1940	1966	
Crossovers /SUVs
Aspen (Note: Based on the Dodge Durango.)	2007	2009	
Pacifica	2004	2008	
Voyager	1988	2016	
Grand Voyager	1988	2007	
TEVan	1993	1995	
Town and Country	1990	2016	

=== Global ===
Name	Orig. / Market	Originally	First	Last	Image
Cars
150 (Note: Designed by Chrysler Europe, previously a Simca model.)	FRA	Simca 1307	1975	1980	
160 / 180 / 2-Litre	FRA	Simca	1970	1982	
Alpine	FRA	Simca 1307	1975	1980	
Avenger (Note: Manufactured by Rootes Group under the Hillman brand)	UK	Hillman Avenger	1976	1979	
Centura (Note: Designed by Chrysler Australia.)	AUS	–	1975	1978	
Charger	AUS	–	1975	1978	
Chrysler by Chrysler	AUS	–	1971	1976	
Delta (Note: Originally, a Lancia model.)	ITA; UK; IRE	Lancia Delta	2011	2014	
Drifter	AUS	–	1977	1978	
ES	EU	Dodge Shadow	1988	1991	
Galant (Note: Originally the Mitsubishi Galant, it was imported to the US as the "Dodge Colt", then marketed by Chrysler Australia.)	JPN; AUS	Mitsubishi Galant	1976	1977	
Horizon (Note: Designed by Chrysler Europe.)	FRA	–	1977	1986	
Hunter (Note: Rebranded Rootes Arrow,)	UK	Rootes Arrow	1977	1979	
Intrepid	CAN	Dodge Intrepid	1993	2004	
Lancer (Note: Originally the Mitsubishi Lancer)	JPN; AUS	Mitsubishi Lancer	1977	1980	
Plainsman	AUS	Chrysler Royal (Australia)	1957	1959	
Regal	AUS	Chrysler Valiant	1976	1981	
Royal	AUS		1957	1963	
Saratoga	EU	Dodge Spirit	1989	1994	
Scorpion (Note: Originally, the Mitsubishi Galant Lambda.)	JPN; AUS	Mitsubishi Galant Lambda	1976	1984	
Sigma	AUS		1977	1980	
Spirit	MEX; ARG	Dodge Spirit	1990	1995	
Stratus	EU	Dodge Stratus	1995	2000	
Sunbeam	GBR		1977	1979	
TC by Maserati (Note: Designed by Chrysler and Maserati.)	ITA	–	1989	1991	
Valiant (Note: Originally a rebranded US-based Plymouth Valiant, then manufactured in Australia.)	AUS		1962	1981	
Valiant Charger	AUS		1971	1978	
Valiant Galant (Note: Originally, the Mitsubishi Galant.)	JPN; AUS	Mitsubishi Galant	1971	1977	
Valiant Lancer (Note: Originally, the Mitsubishi Lancer A70.)	JPN; AUS	Mitsubishi Lancer (A70)	1977	1981	
VIP	AUS		1969	1971	
Vision (Note: Originally, an Eagle-branded model.)	EU	Eagle Vision	1992	1997	
Wayfarer	AUS	Chrysler Royal (Australia)	1957	1961	
Kew / Wimbledon	UK		1936	1937	
Ypsilon	ITA; UK; JPN	Lancia Ypsilon	2011	2015	

== Concept cars ==
image	name	year shown
	200 EV	2009
	Airflite	2003
	Airflow EV	2022
	Akino	2005
	Atlantic	1995
	C-200	1952
	California Cruiser	2002
	CCV	2000
	Chronos	1998
	Citadel	2000
	700C	2012
	Delta	2010
	ecoVoyager	2008
	Falcon	1955
	Firepower	2005
	Halcyon	2024
	Imperial Concept	2006
	Java	1998
	ME Four-Twelve	2004
	Nassau	2007
	Natrium	2001
	Norseman	1956
	Pacifica Concept	1999
	Patriot	1993
	Phaeton	1997
	Portal	2017
	Pronto Cruizer	1999
