= Chrysler Valiant =

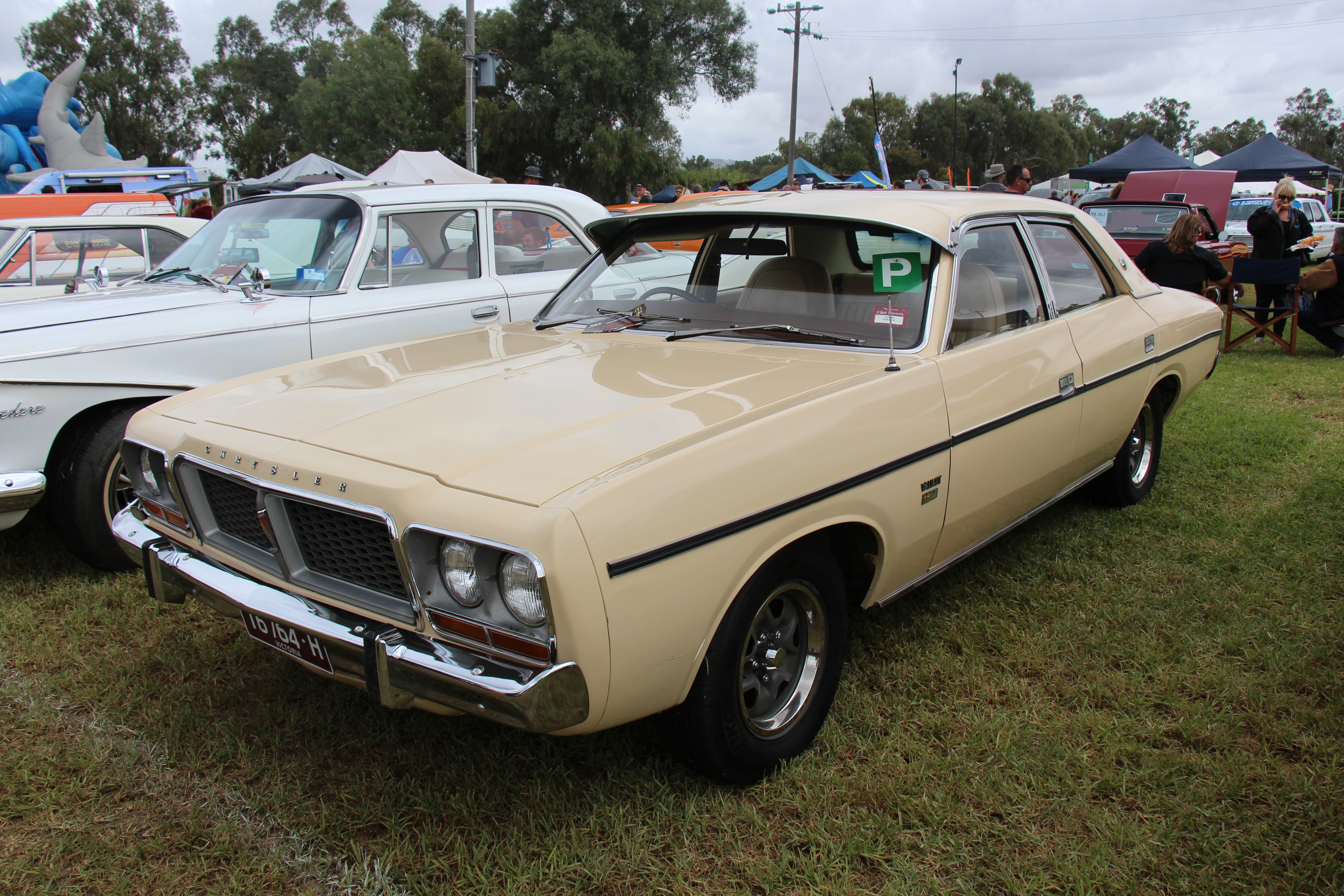
- Chrysler Valiant Sedan (CM)

Overview
- Manufacturer: Chrysler Australia (1962–1980); Mitsubishi Australia (1980–1981)
- Also called: Chrysler Charger (1975–1978); Chrysler Regal (1976–1981); Dodge Utility
- Production: 1962–1981
- Assembly: Australia: Mile End, South Australia (1962–1964); Australia: Tonsley Park, South Australia (1964–1981); New Zealand: Petone (Todd Motors Group: 1963–1979)

Body and chassis
- Class: Full-size
- Body style: 4-door sedan 5-door station wagon 2-door hardtop 2-door coupe 2-door coupe utility 2-door sedan delivery (panel van)
- Related: Chrysler VIP; Chrysler by Chrysler

Chronology
- Predecessor: Chrysler Royal
- Successor: Mitsubishi Magna

The Chrysler Valiant is a full-size car which was sold by Chrysler Australia between 1962 and 1981. Initially a rebadged locally assembled Plymouth Valiant from the United States, from the second generation launched in 1963, the Valiant was fully manufactured in Australia. It was sold locally but also in New Zealand and South Africa, with smaller numbers also exported to South-East Asia and the United Kingdom.

Parent company Chrysler made a substantial investment in Australian manufacturing facilities by establishing operations in South Australia with an assembly plant at Tonsley Park in 1964 and an engine foundry at Lonsdale in 1968. The Valiant thus established its position as the third of the "Big 3" Australian-made vehicles behind the Holden Kingswood and Ford Falcon.

The Australian Valiant was built on the North American A-body platform but with many parts and components from Australian suppliers. Apart from a sedan and wagon body style, 1965 saw the introduction of a commercial utility that was badged the Wayfarer and later exported to South Africa as the Rustler.

Greater differentiation from the donor car crept in over time, particularly since the VE series, which was embraced by the Australian motoring press and won the 1967 Wheels magazine Car of the Year award. The VF series of 1969 and the VG of 1970 departed even further from its North American donor both in terms of styling and performance—with the latter series introducing the Hemi-6 engine that replaced the Slant-6. Moreover, Australia continued to produce a station wagon model, called the Safari, even after this body style was discontinued for North America.

Beginning in 1971, the VH series saw Chrysler Australia develop the entire lineup locally including the Charger. Local design and production continued until the CM series of 1979, which marked the end of local production in 1981, after the takeover of operations by Mitsubishi Motors Australia.

== First generation ==
=== RV1 (R Series) ===
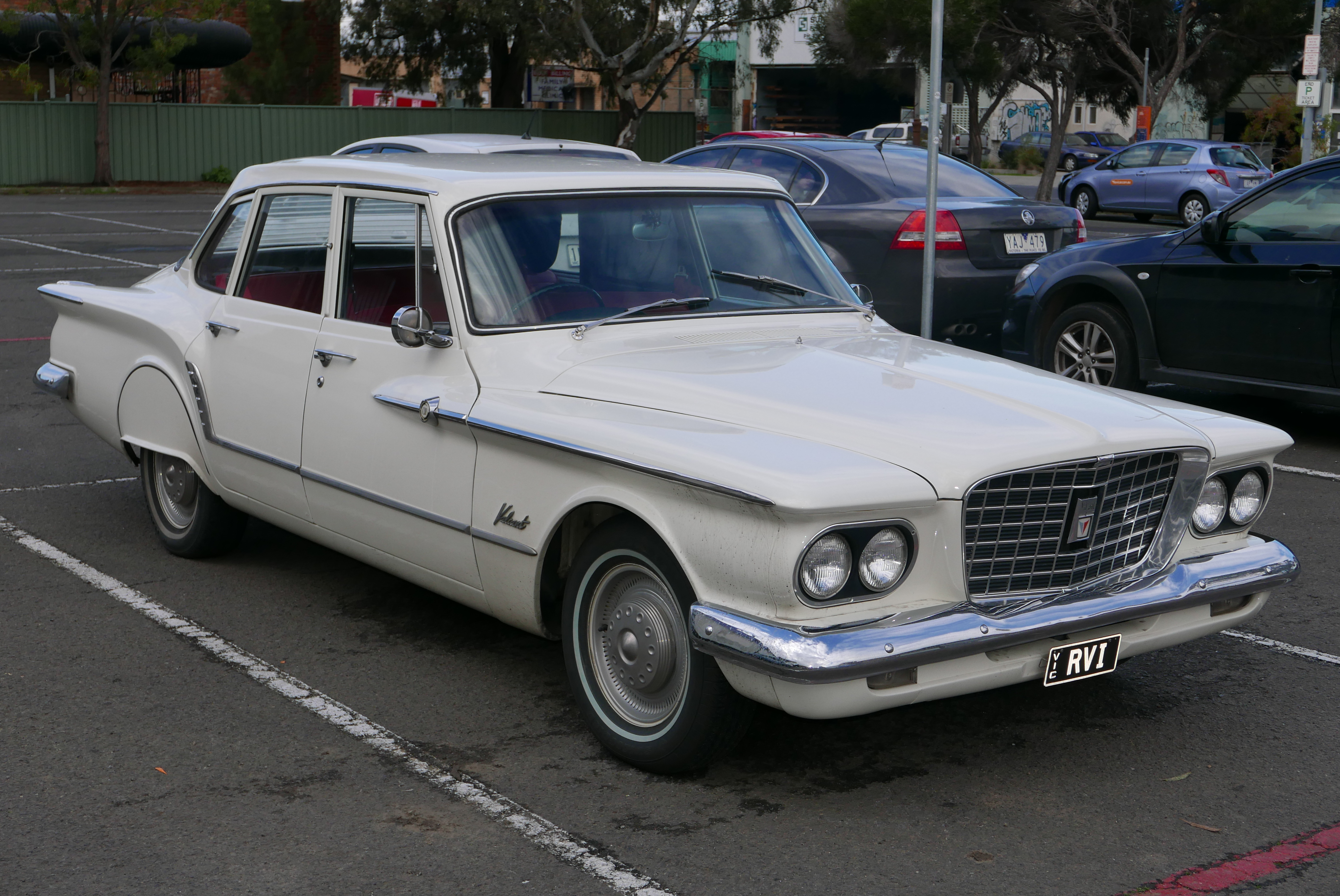
RV1 Valiant sedan

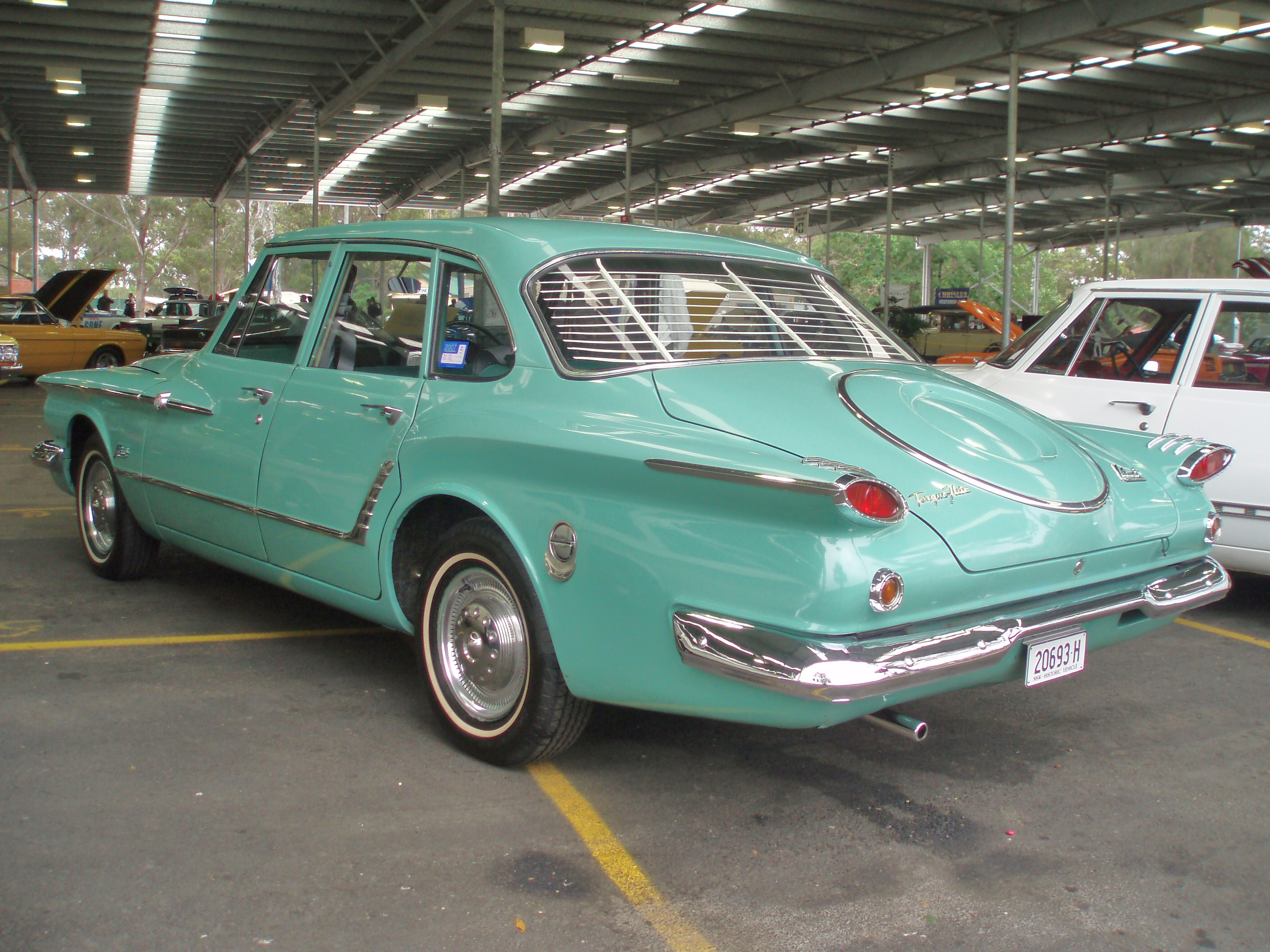
RV1 Valiant sedan

After the Plymouth Valiant turned out to be a success in the United States (starting with its 1959 introduction), Chrysler released Australia's first locally assembled Valiant, the RV1 (R-series). It was officially unveiled by South Australia's Premier, Sir Thomas Playford, in January 1962 and was assembled at Chrysler's Mile End facility.

The RV1 (or R Series) Valiant became successful quickly. Not all considered the styling good, but the general consensus was that the car had a modern quality reminiscent of the space age to it.

Also notable was the Valiant's performance with 145 brake horsepower (108 kW) from the 225 Slant-6 engine. This was a lot of power compared to the competing Holdens and Fords, which offered only 75 bhp (56 kW) and 90 bhp (67 kW) SAE respectively.

Standard transmission in the RV1 was a floor-shifted three-speed manual with a non-synchro first gear. A button-operated three-speed TorqueFlite automatic was optional. Other options included a heater-demister unit, as well as a "Moparmatic" deluxe pushbutton transistor radio.

The RV1 Valiant was the first Australian car to come with an alternator instead of a generator, and instead of coil springs, the Valiant came with torsion bar suspension. Brakes were hydraulic 9" drums front and rear. The RV1 had a simulated spare wheel outline on the bootlid, but the spare wheel was actually under the floor of the boot.

The base model was sold for £1299.

=== SV1 (S Series) ===
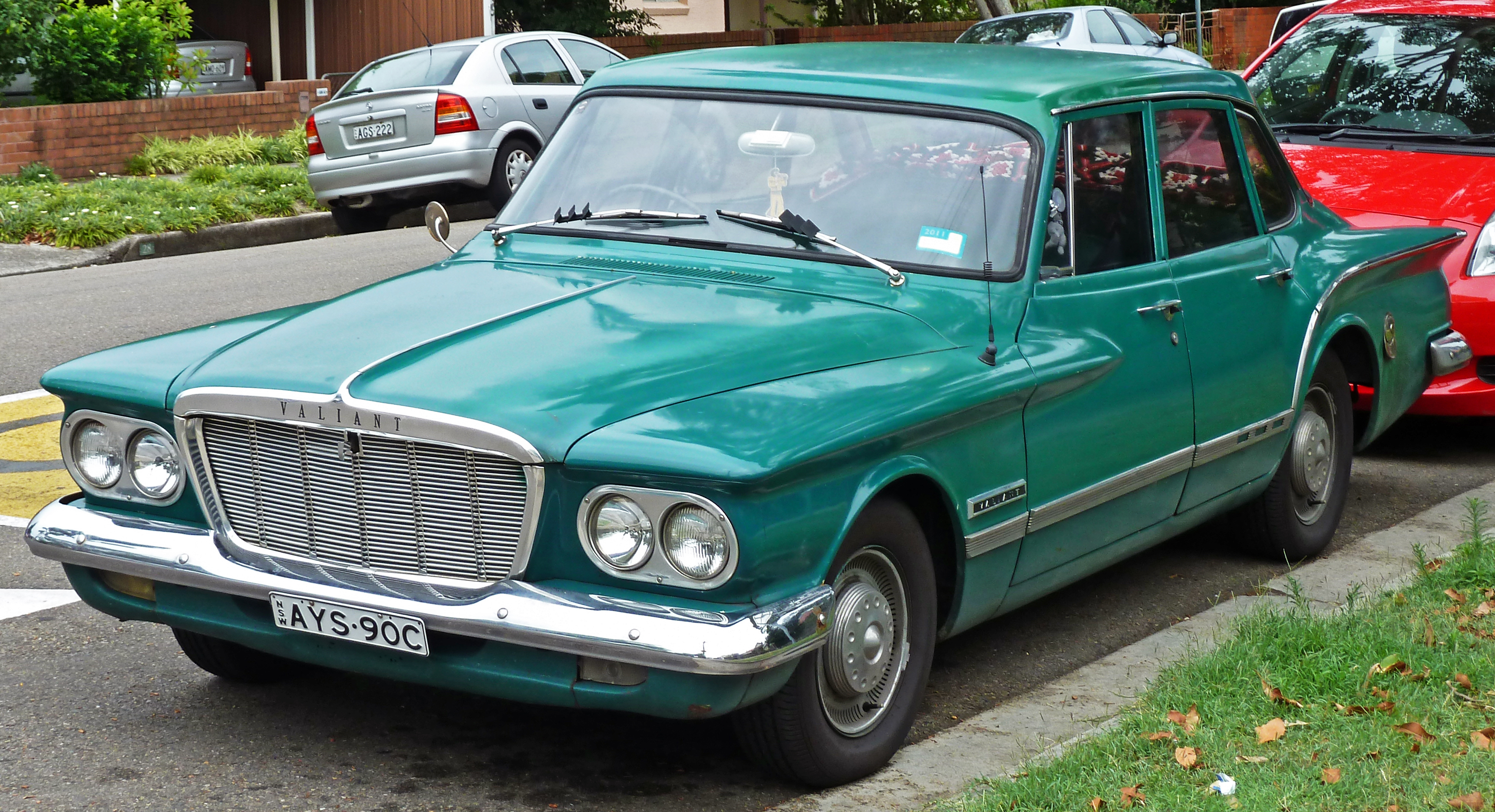
SV1 Valiant sedan

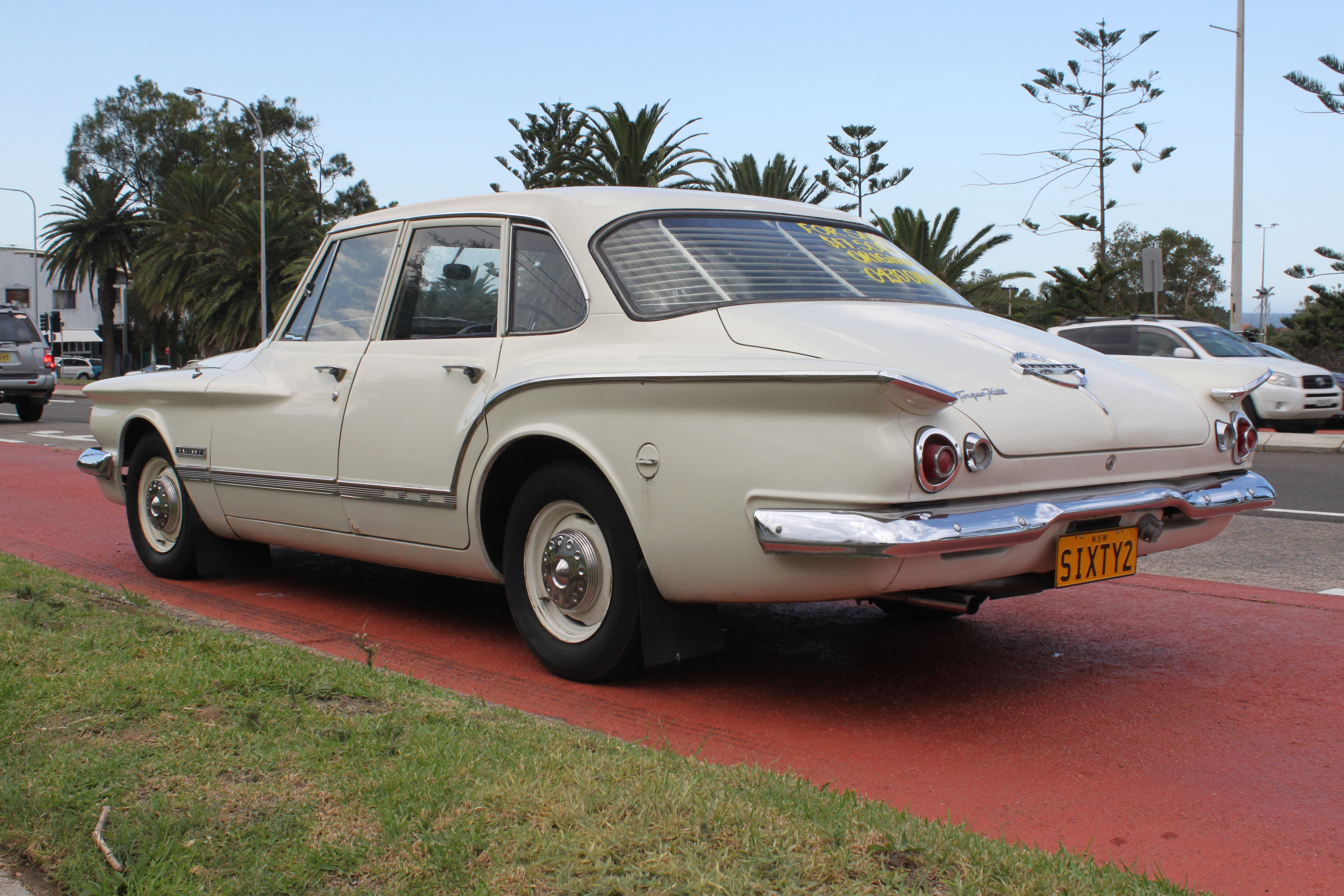
SV1 Valiant sedan

In March 1962, Chrysler replaced the American 1961-model R Valiant with the American 1962 SV1 (S Series) Valiant. The SV1 used the same body shell as the RV1, with cosmetic changes including the deletion of the simulated spare wheel on the bootlid, and round tail lamps replacing the R-model's cat-eye shaped ones. There was a revised radiator grille and new exterior trim.

Mechanical changes included relocation of the manual transmission shifter to the steering column, new ball joints, and a new gear-reduction starter motor.

10,009 SV1 Valiants were sold, of which 5,496 were automatics and 4,513 were manuals.

== Second generation ==
=== AP5 Series ===
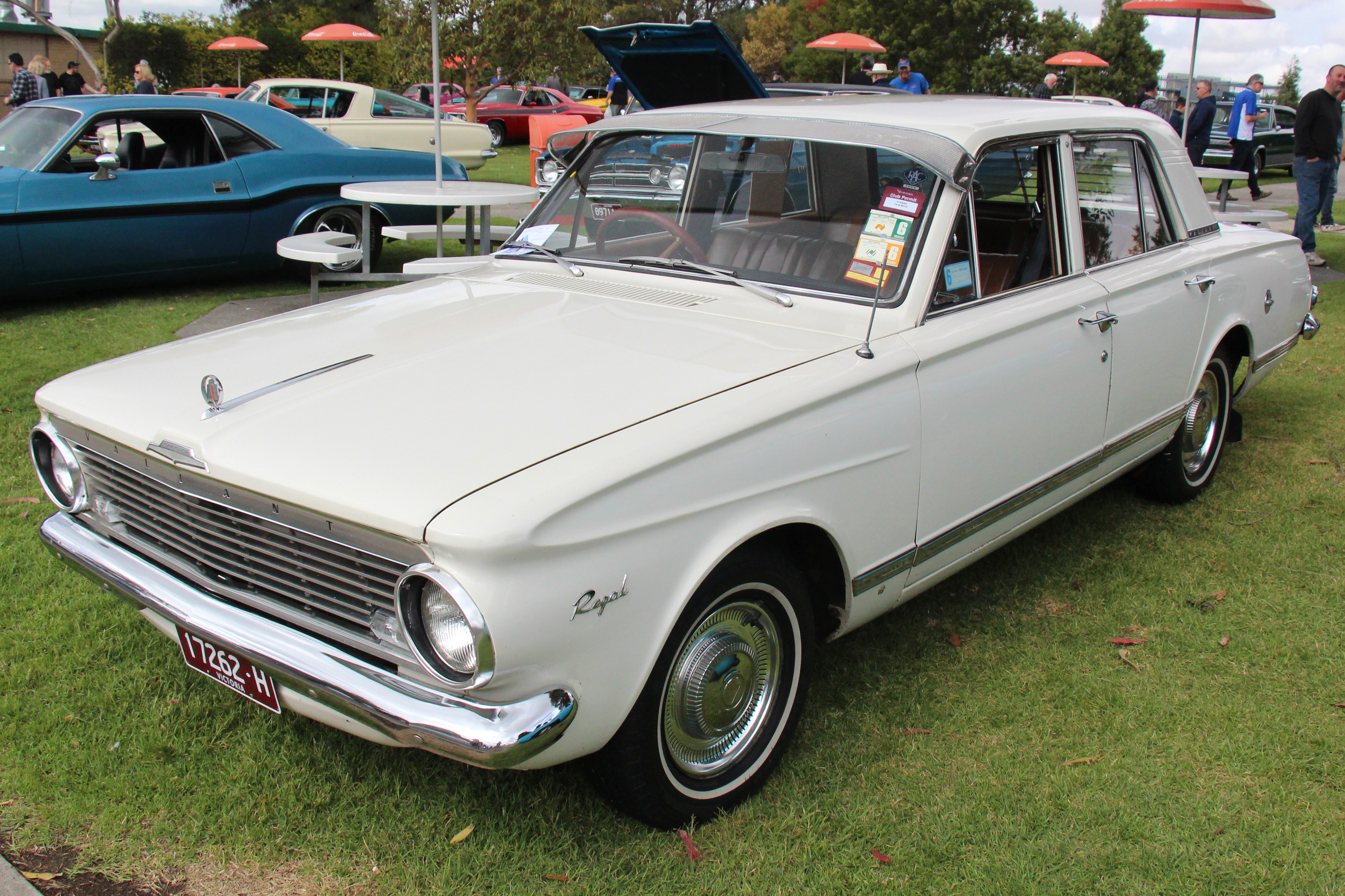
AP5 Valiant Regal sedan

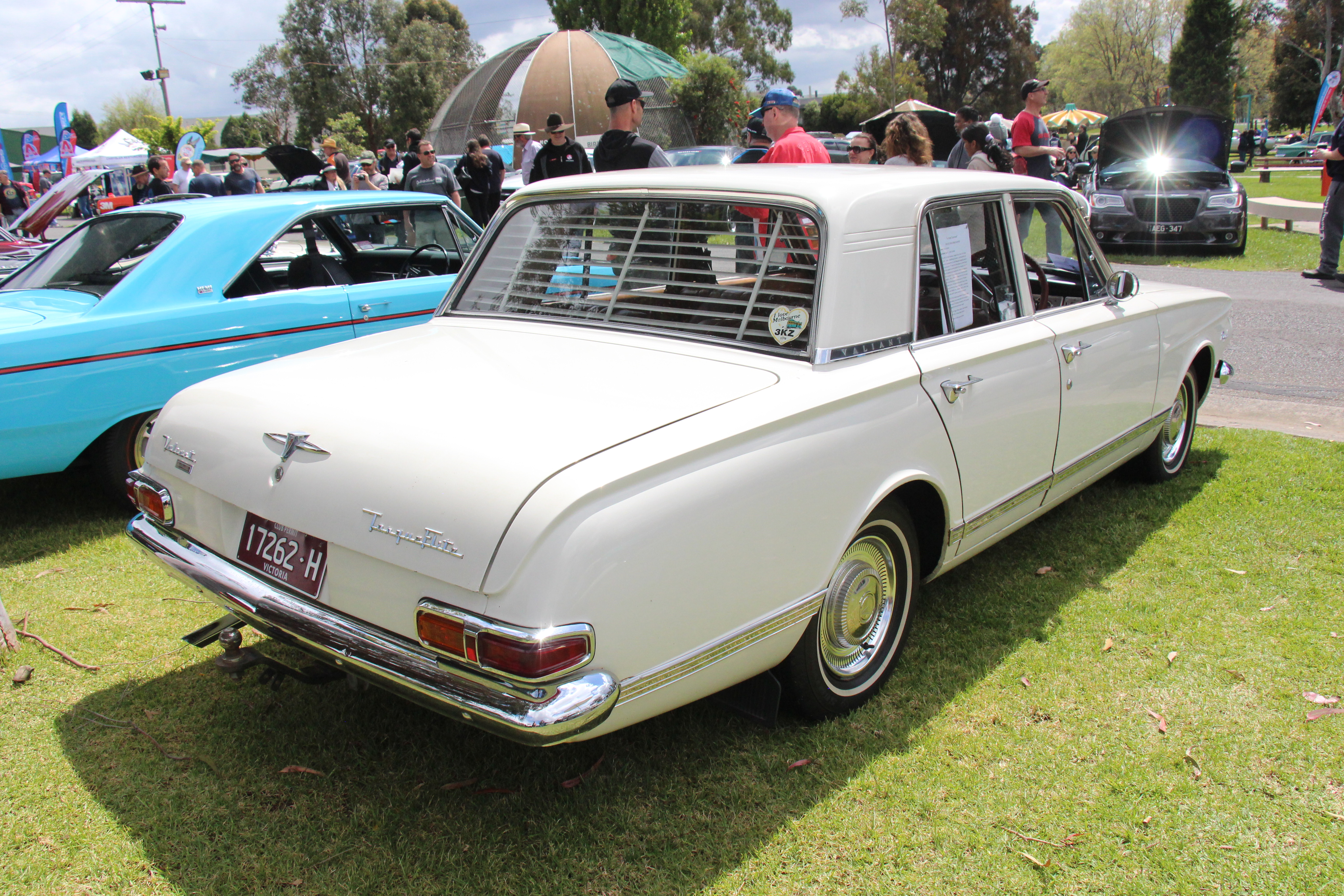
AP5 Valiant Regal sedan

On 30 May 1963, Chrysler Australia produced the first fully Australian manufactured Valiant, the AP5. In February of that year, Chrysler Australia had begun work on its new $36 million Tonsley Park facility in South Australia, where it could boost annual production to 50 thousand cars. The new plant produced its first Valiants on 31 March 1964.

The AP5 ("AP" for Australian Production) was an entirely new design with only the four doors, windscreen, and front guards shared with its North American counterpart. Initial cars retained the left-hand-drive wiper pattern but this was soon changed to a RHD layout. The Slant-6 driveline was retained, but the AP5 was considerably more straightforward in styling than its R- and S-model antecedents. With high local content and specifications optimised for local conditions, this new Valiant strengthened the brand's position in the marketplace. A new upmarket Regal version was included in the range. In November 1963 an AP5 Safari station wagon was released. Total production of the AP5 range amounted to 49,440 vehicles.

=== AP6 Series ===
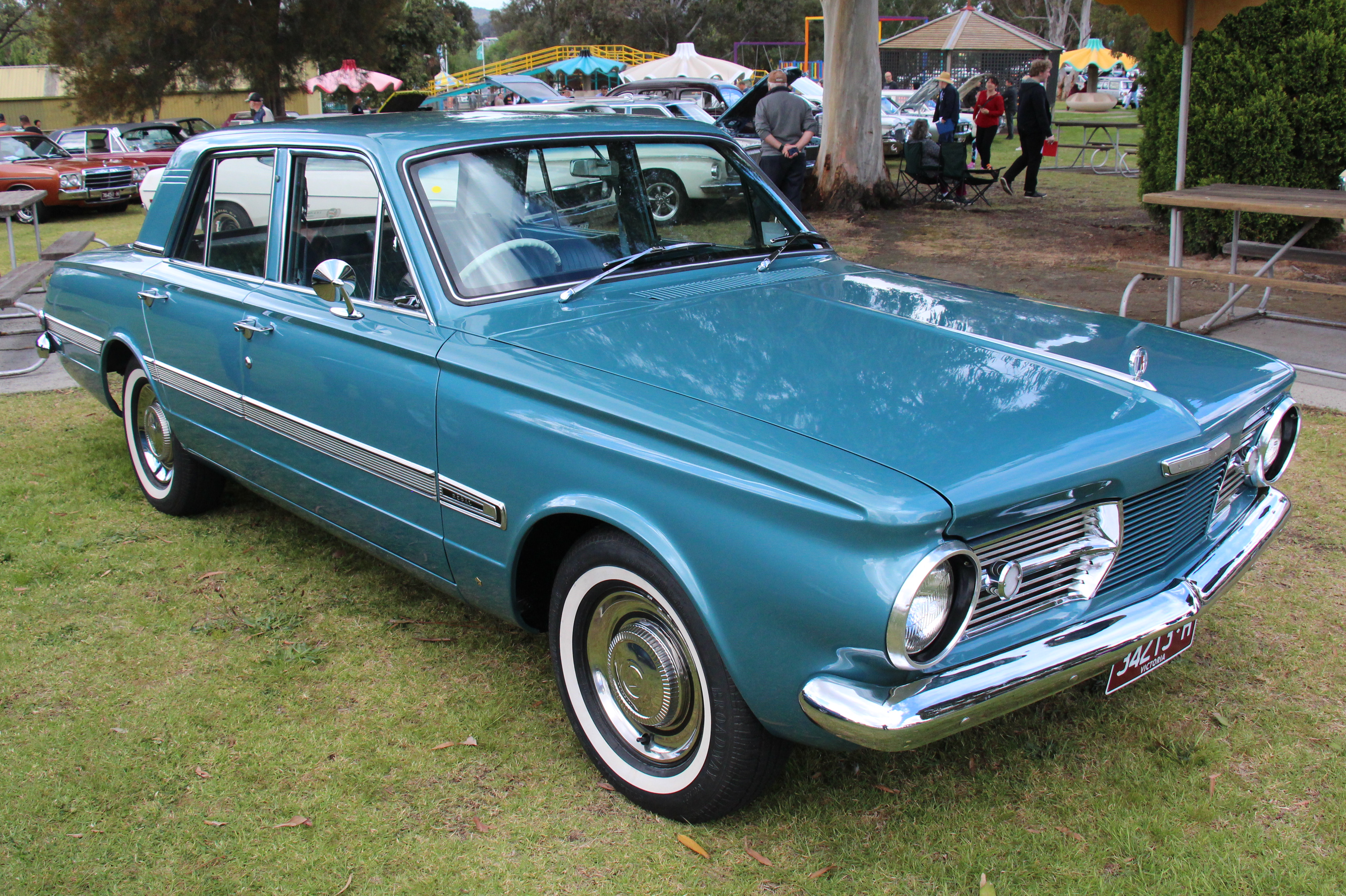
AP6 Valiant Regal sedan

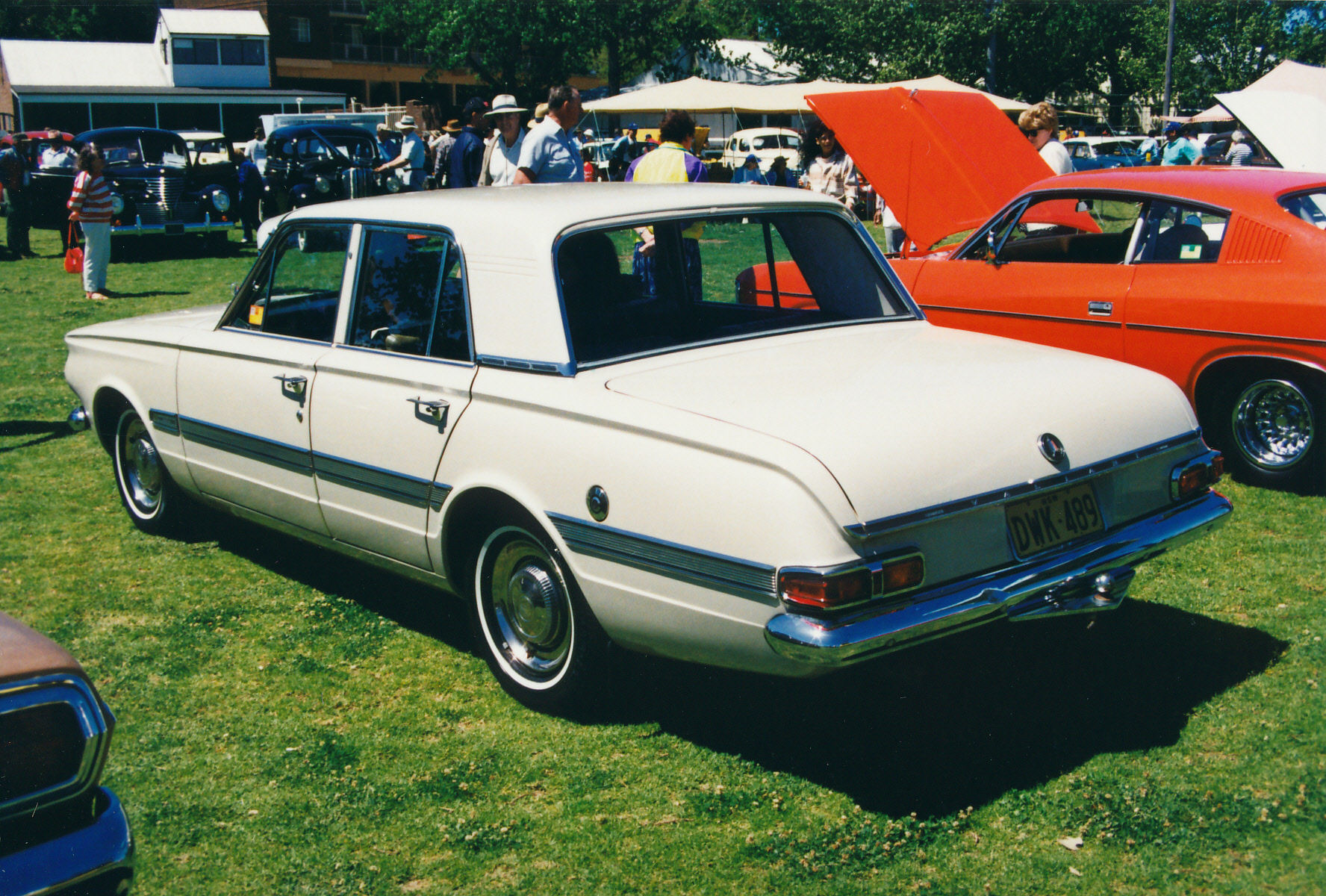
AP6 Valiant Regal Sedan

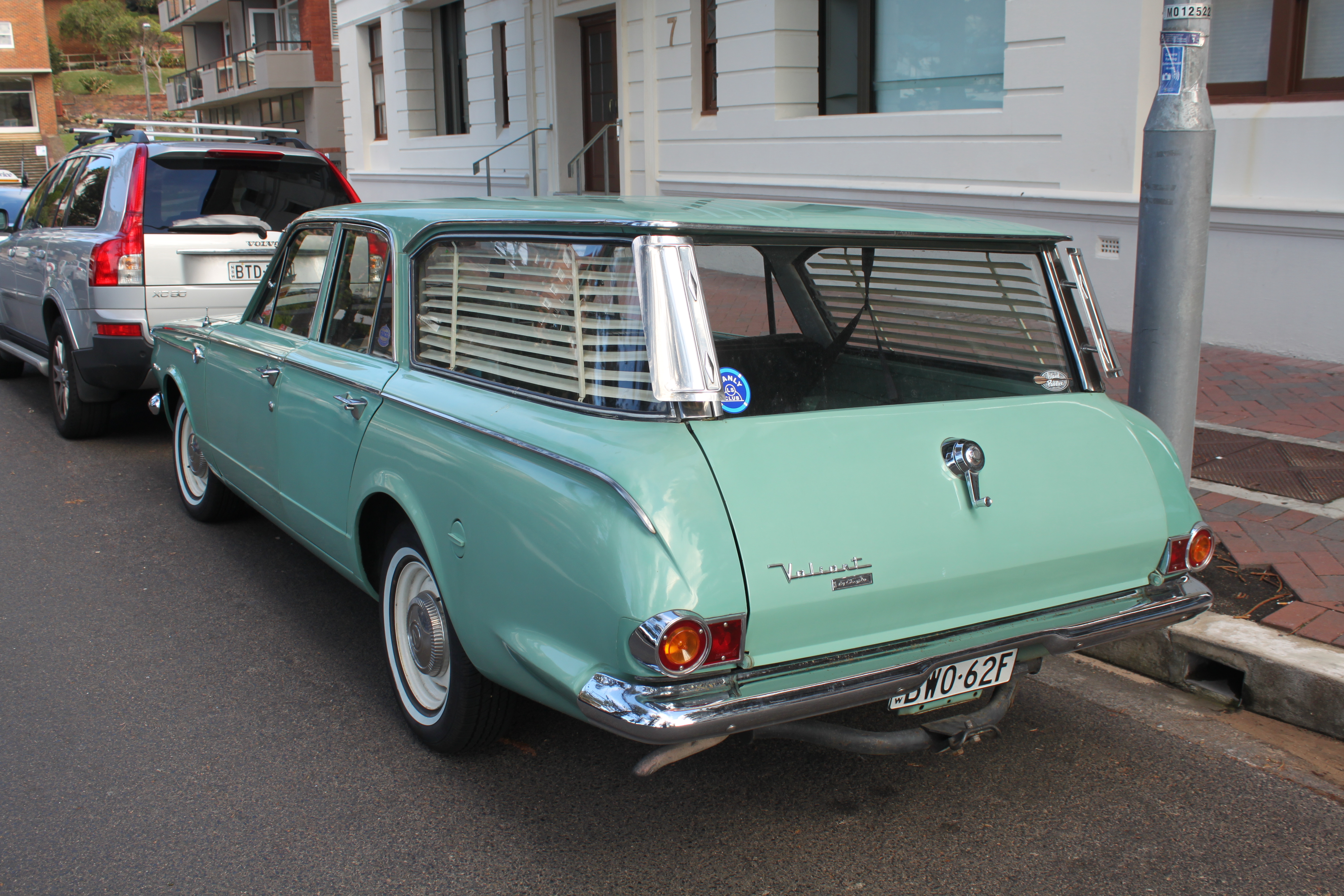
AP6 Valiant Safari Wagon

In March 1965, the AP5 was supplanted by the AP6. The body shell was the same, but there was a new grille on the theme of the 1964 North American Plymouth Barracuda, and there was new trim inside and out. The automatic transmission was no longer controlled by pushbuttons, but instead by a conventional shift lever. The AP6 also included other new features such as self-adjusting brakes and acrylic enamel paint, at the time the most advanced auto finish available. The AP6 model range included the Valiant Wayfarer, the first Valiant-based coupe utility to be built by Chrysler Australia.

The AP6 was the first Australian-built Valiant to be offered with a V8 engine – the 273 cu in (4.47 L) LA V8, introduced in American Valiants in 1964, and released in Australia in August 1965. The engine developed 180 brake horsepower (130 kW) and pushed the Valiant to a top speed of 109 mph (175 km/h).

The V8 was only available as a model in its own right, the V8 Valiant, which had a vinyl-covered roof, individual bucket seats, floor console mounted automatic shift lever and two-tone steering wheel.

The Slant-6's camshaft was also slightly upgraded for improved torque by dint of increased duration and lift.

Chrysler Australia had difficulty meeting demand, with the Valiant being built at Tonsley Park at a maximum rate of 200 cars per eight-hour shift. Customers had to wait up to four months for delivery of a new AP6. Prices ran from $2,500 to $3,650.

=== VC Series ===
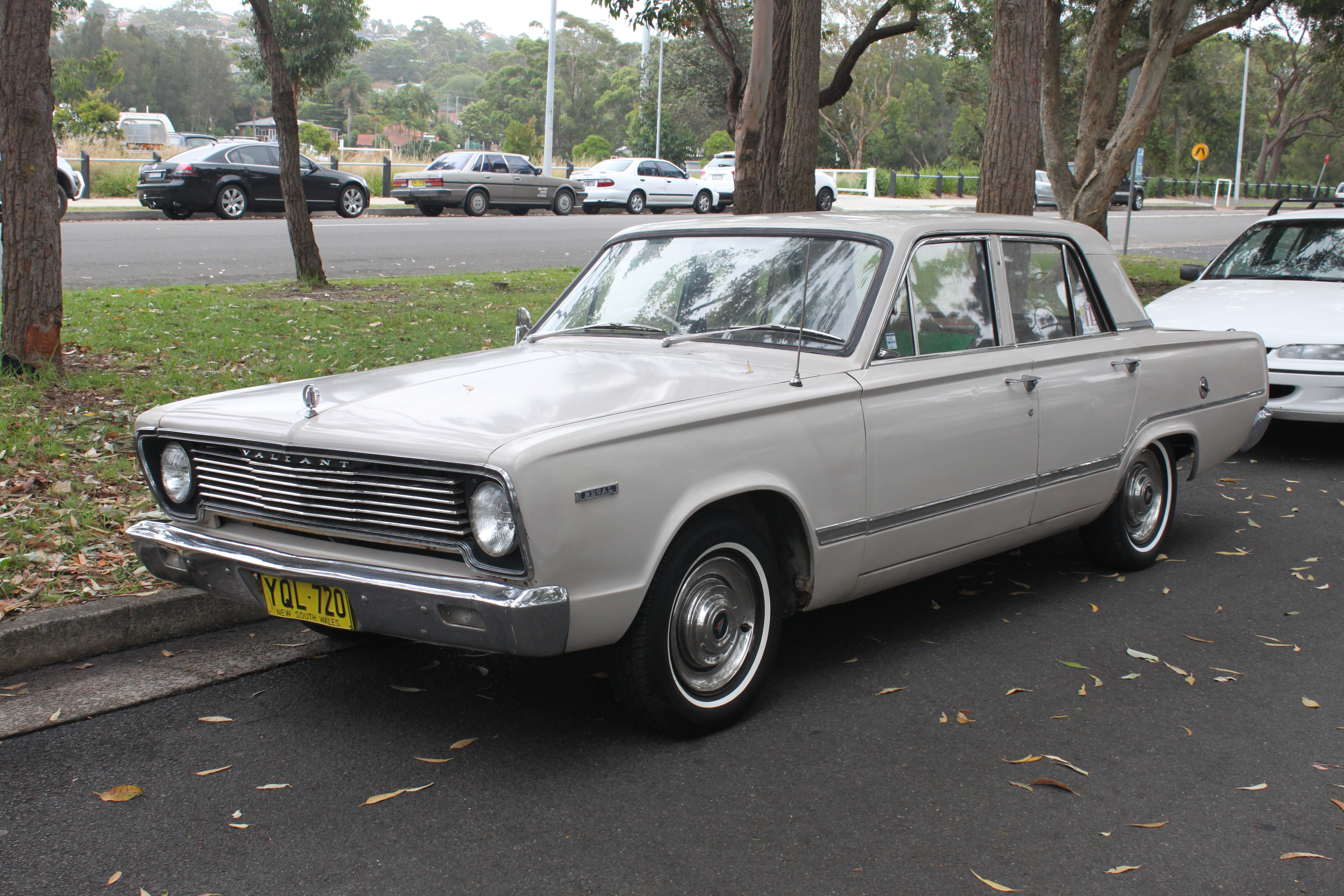
VC Valiant Regal sedan

The VC Valiant was introduced in March 1966 and, although underneath it was basically the same car as the preceding AP6 Series, the body was extensively restyled giving the illusion of being longer and lower.

The modern new design was highlighted by sharp, squared-off edges and corners clearly influenced by Chrysler in the United States. The front now had a full-width horizontal grille while the rear was also much squarer with vertical taillights.

The range of models again consisted of the Valiant standard or Regal sedan, standard or Safari Regal wagon and Wayfarer utility. They featured higher standard equipment levels as well as new safety features, such as optional disc brakes on V8 models, which were named 'Valiant V8/Safari V8' and were essentially Regal models.

The VC Series was built both for its major market, Australia, but also for export to the United Kingdom, as announced at the October 1966 London Motor Show, based on the following range of uniquely named models (brackets indicate the equivalent Australian nameplate):

- Medium Saloon (Valiant equivalent)
- Medium Safari Estate Car (Valiant Safari wagon equivalent)
- Regal Highline Saloon Automatic (Valiant Regal equivalent)
- Regal Highline Safari (Valiant Safari Regal wagon equivalent)
- Premium V8 Saloon (Valiant V8 equivalent)
- Premium Safari Estate Car (Valiant Safari V8 wagon equivalent)

In total, Chrysler Australia built 65,634 VC Series models.

== Third generation ==
=== VE Series ===
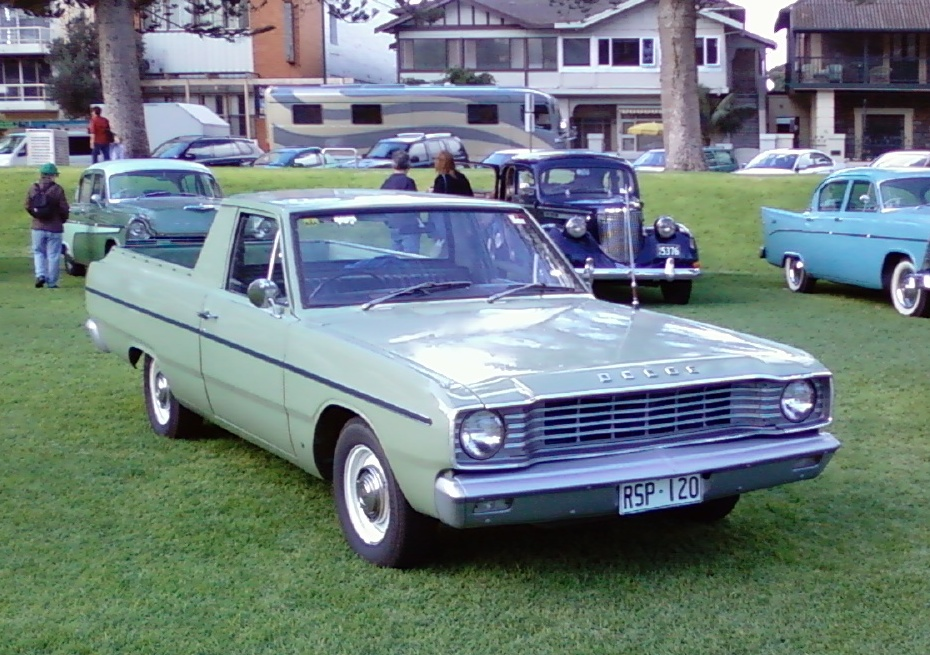
Dodge utility, a lower-priced version of the VE Valiant utility

This Valiant was an all-new design introduced in October 1967, based on the North American platform, which had a 108 in (2,700 mm) wheelbase. The bonnet and guards were shared with the also-new 1967 North American Dodge Dart, with other styling cues otherwise inherited from the North American Valiant. The car featured slightly larger body dimensions and greater interior space than the preceding VC Series. The roofline was also flattened out and the rear window was given a concave profile.

Higher levels of standard equipment were featured and two engine options became available. The basic Slant-6 was retained with its 145 bhp (108 kW) rating, but a new 2-barrel carbureted version was released with output of 160 bhp (120 kW). The 273 V8 was also improved and made available across the entire Valiant range.

Other upgrades included the introduction of a larger 64-litre (14 imp gal; 17 US gal) fuel tank, shorter gear lever throw on the manual gearbox, relocation of the dipswitch from under the brake pedal to the high left of the firewall, and the windscreen wiper motor was relocated to the engine side of the firewall – greatly reducing wiper noise. All models benefited from additional safety features (some compulsory under new Australian Design Rules, or ADRs) such as dual circuit brakes with a tandem master cylinder, double sided safety rims, front seat belts and front power disc brakes on V8 models.

The VE range consisted of Valiant & Valiant Regal sedans, Valiant Safari & Valiant Regal Safari station wagons and Valiant, Valiant Wayfarer & Dodge utilities, the latter being a lower-priced version of the Valiant utility. The flagship model followed on from the AP6 and VC V8 theme, being similarly equipped with bucket seats, floor shift automatic, and vinyl roof all standard, but was given the new name "VIP" to distinguish it from other models, since the V8 engine option was made available across the range. It also shared the 3 'sergeant stripes' of the VC V8 on the rear quarter panel.

The biggest accolade for the VE Valiant was Wheels "Car of the Year" in 1967 – the first for Chrysler Australia.

68,688 VE Valiants were built.

=== VF Series ===
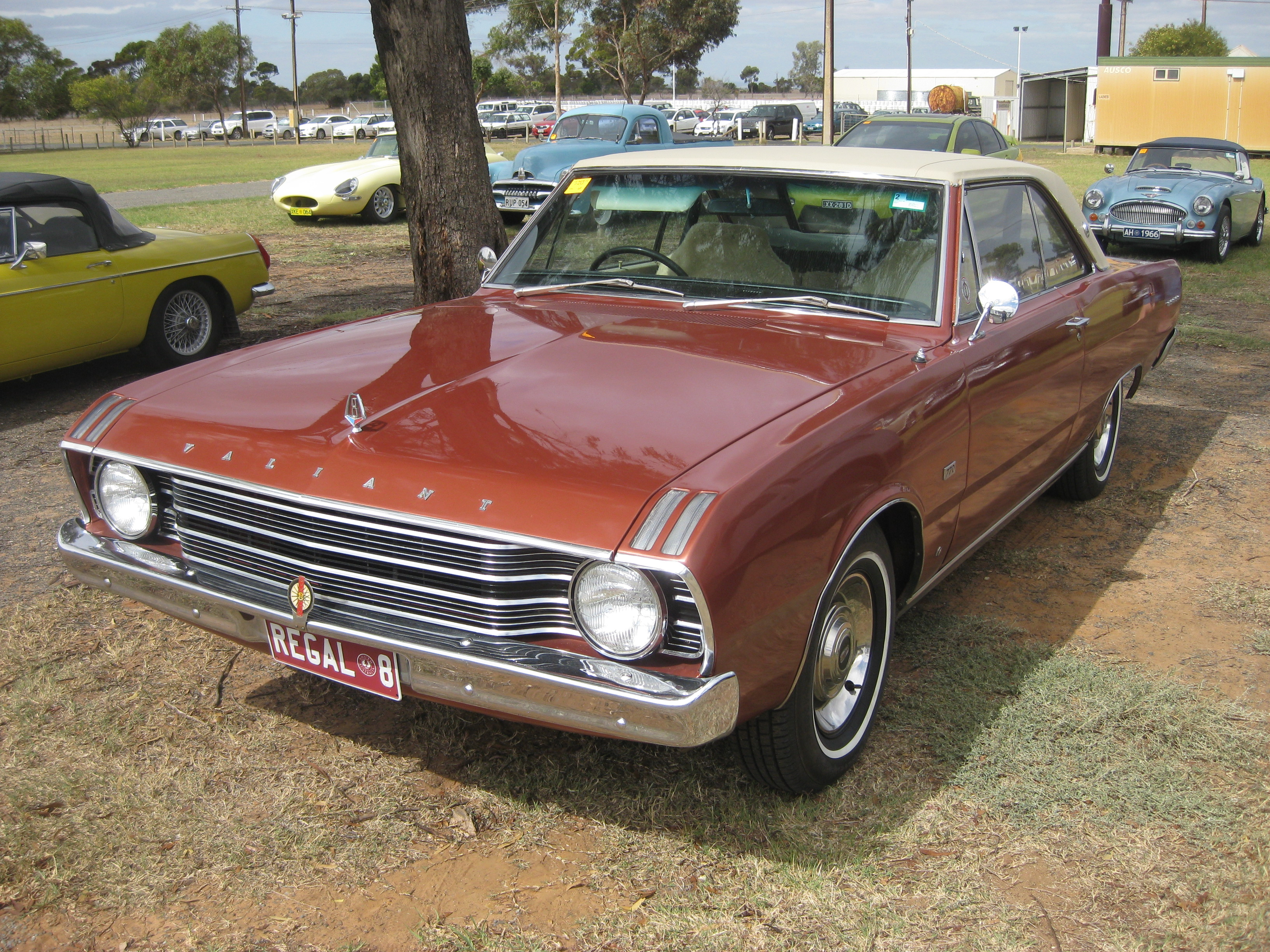
VF Valiant Regal 770 hardtop

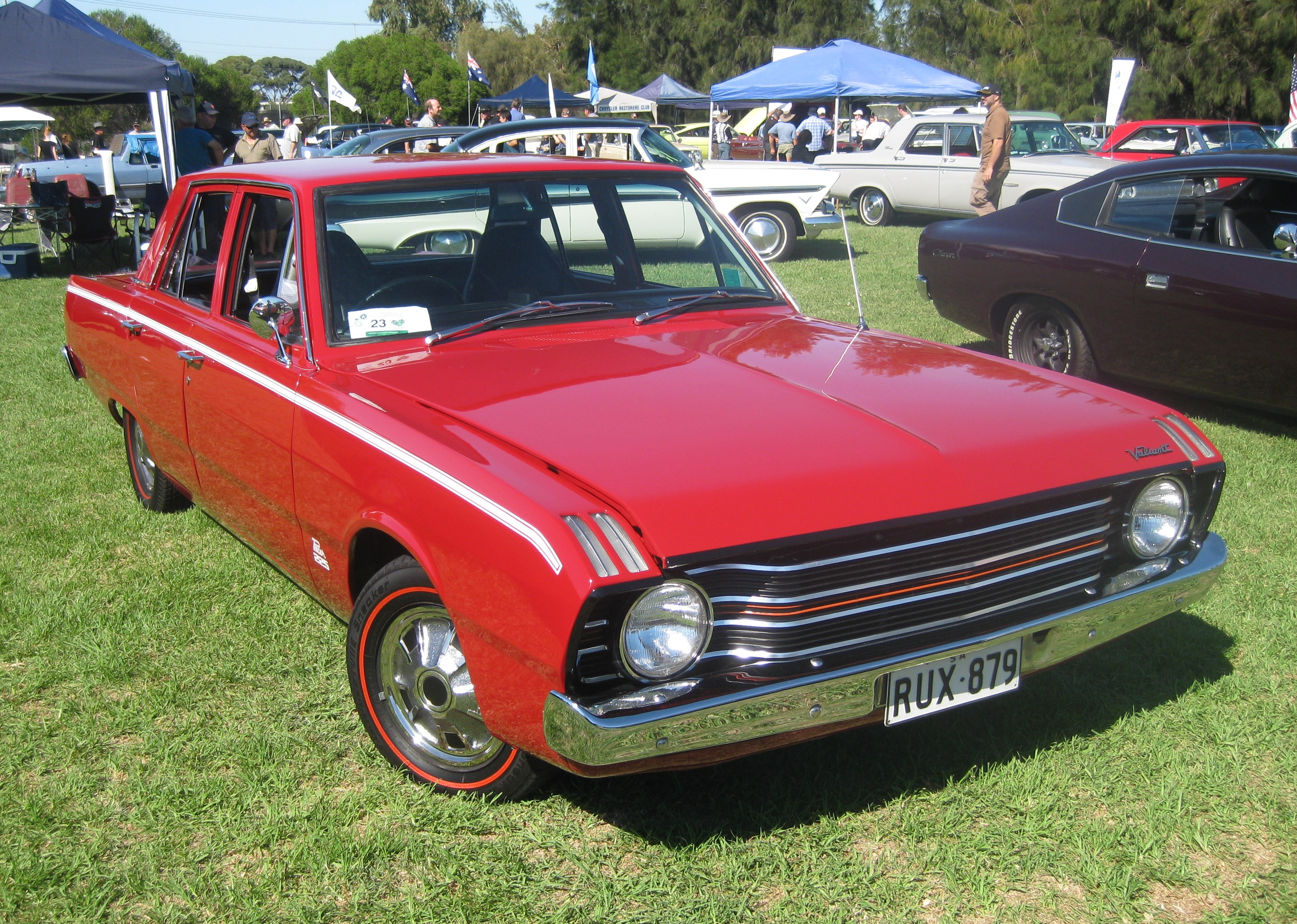
VF Valiant Pacer

In March 1969, the VE was replaced by the VF model. The new car shared its middle section with the previous VE Valiant, but there was new front and rear styling. The new front end featured a horizontally convex grille, replacing the VE's concave design. The front indicators were placed at the top leading edge of the front guards rather than in a more conventional location in the grille or front bumper. This allowed the VF's front bumper to be thinner and less prominent, which made the single round headlights look larger, and the front end appeared more aggressive as a result.

Valiant and Valiant Regal models were once again available, and the VF range also saw the introduction of the Valiant Regal 770 and an upgraded VIP model. The VF VIP was introduced two months after the Valiant range and was no longer a Valiant V.I.P. but was now marketed as a Chrysler VIP, in sedan form only. It offered a stretched (112 inches or 2,800 millimetres) wheelbase, with longer rear doors than the Valiant. As with previous model changes, the VF boasted even more safety features including a padded instrument panel and energy absorbing steering column.

A larger 5.2 L (318 cu in) version of the LA V8 replaced the 273, taking the V8's top speed to 109 mph (175 km/h). Transmission options remained the same: three-speed manual or three-speed TorqueFlite automatic.

The most significant introduction to the VF range was the all new two-door Valiant Hardtop – essentially, a North American Dodge Dart coupé with the Australian Valiant front sheetmetal and interior trim. At over 5,000 mm (200 in), it is the longest coupe ever built in Australia. Released six months after the other VF Valiants in September 1969, it was available in Valiant, Valiant Regal and Valiant Regal 770 models.

In mid 1969, Chrysler released a fast four-door named Valiant Pacer. A low-cost, high-power version of the bread-and-butter Valiant sedan, the Pacer featured a high-performance six-cylinder engine and three-speed manual gearbox with floor shifter. Despite a lack of exterior chrome, the VF Pacer stood out with its red and black grille, simulated-mag wheel hub caps, special body striping, 'Pacer 225' decals, and choice of "Wild Blue", "Wild Red", or "Wild Yellow" exterior colours. The sparsely trimmed interior featured high back bucket seats, and distinctive black on white instrument dials with a dash-top-mounted tachometer. Although lacking the V8 of its rivals, the Pacer could reach almost 180 km/h (112 mph) and, at $2798, was $400 cheaper than the base GTS Monaro. The Pacer was powered by a special version of the trusty 225 Slant-6. With two-barrel carburettor, high-flow exhaust system, and 9.3:1 compression ratio, it produced 175 bhp (130 kW). Standard brakes were finned, servo-assisted drum brakes all round, although most buyers opted for the optional front discs. Underneath was Valiant's basic torsion bar suspension, lowered by 125 mm (5 in) to improve handling and with a front anti-sway bar fitted. A 'Sure-Grip' limited-slip differential with either 3.23:1 or 2.92:1 ratios was optional.

Contemporary road testers were mostly full of praise for the Pacer, noting there were few cars that could match it on a performance for price basis. Modern Motor (May, 1969) took a VF Pacer sedan to 60 mph (97 km/h) in a respectable 10.5 seconds, the 1/4 mile (400 m) in 17.5 seconds and topped out at 111 mph (179 km/h).

In 1969, Chrysler's market share reached 13.7%. In total, 52,944 VF Valiants were built.

=== VG Series ===
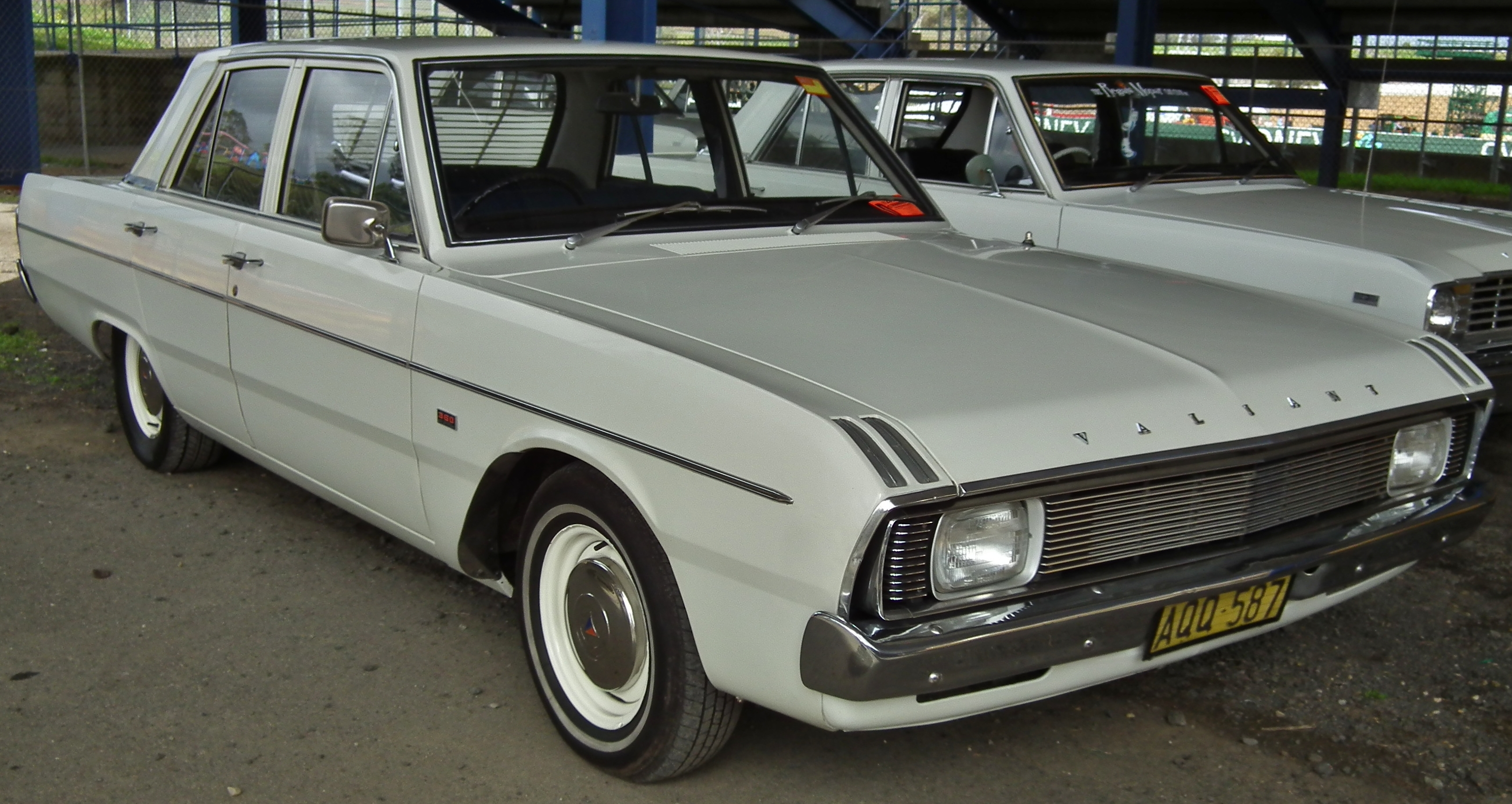
VG Valiant sedan

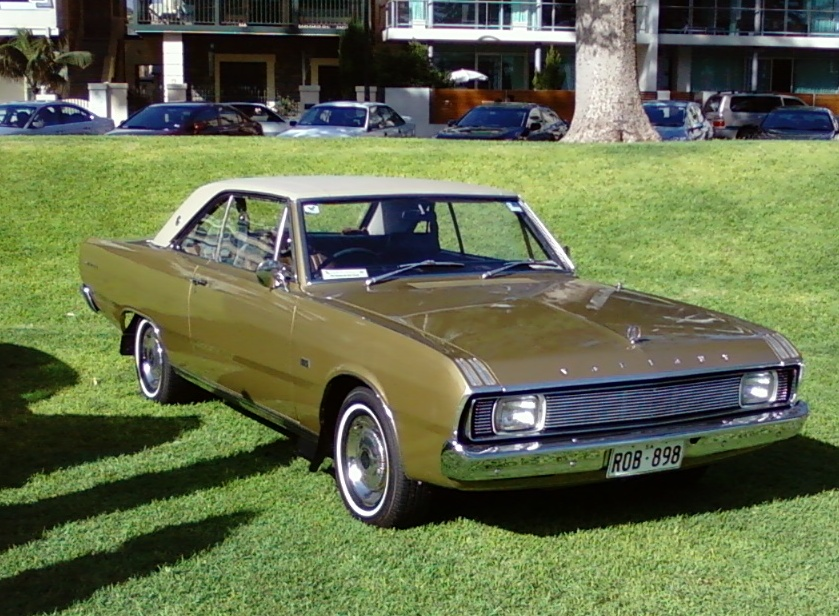
VG Valiant Regal 770 hardtop

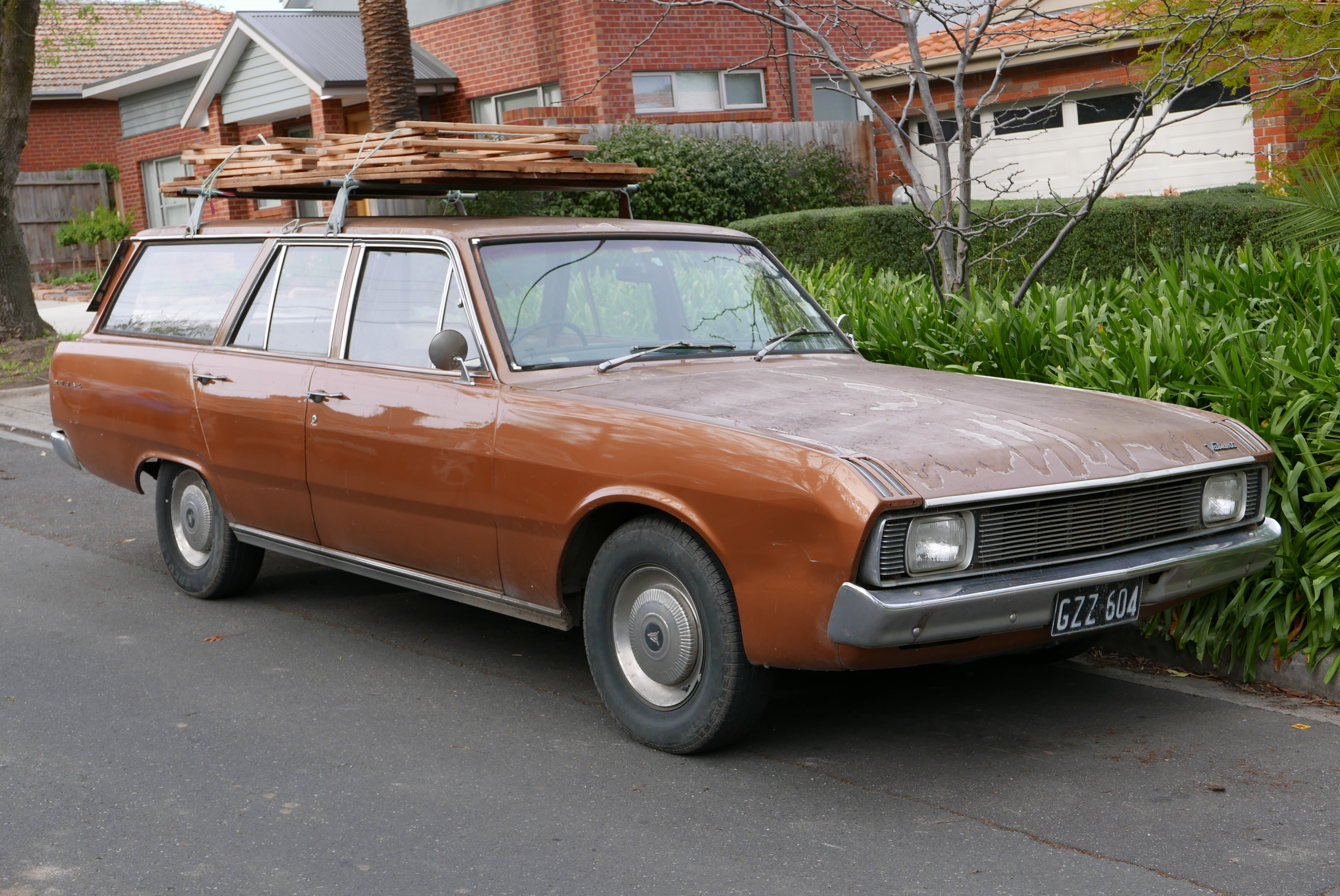
VG Valiant Regal Safari station wagon

August 1970 saw the introduction of another facelifted version of the VE/VF bodystyle in the VG Valiant. The VG's most noticeable difference was the use of rectangular headlamps instead of the traditional round ones (except on VIP models, which used quad round headlamps). The guard-top indicator location was carried over from the VF. The grille was a horizontal, single-plane item, and the taillamps were revised and wrapped around to the body side. Sedan, Wagon, Ute and Hardtop body styles were offered once again as well as the same luxury levels as before.

The biggest announcement to come with the VG Valiant was of the all new Hemi-6 engine, replacing the Slant-6. The new engine was introduced as a 245 cu in (4.0 L) unit with quasi-hemispherical combustion chambers. The "Hemi" name was already legendary in America with Chrysler's use of the Hemi V8, hence Chrysler Australia's marketing leverage for its 6-cylinder offering. The 1-barrel version of the 245 produced 165 bhp (123 kW) and 235 lbf⋅ft (319 N⋅m).

The sporty Pacer sedan was available again, but whereas the VF Pacer was only offered with the one power output, the new VG Pacer offered 3 different versions of the new 245 Hemi-6 engine, though Chrysler Australia didn't publish any power output figures for the Pacers. The standard Pacer had a 2-barrel carburettor and produced 185 bhp (138 kW). Option E31 produced 195 bhp (145 kW) and included a two-barrel carburettor, higher-performance camshaft, smaller fan, and windage tray. Option E34 produced 235 bhp (175 kW) and included a 4-barrel carburettor, high-performance camshaft, dual-plate clutch, manual choke, modified instrument cluster, torque-limiting engine mount strut, larger radiator, smaller fan, windage tray, premium engine bearings, shot-peened crankshaft and connecting rods, and high-capacity oil pump. Option E35 included a 4-barrel carburettor, high-performance camshaft, heavy-duty engine bearings, a dual-plate clutch, torque-limiting engine mount strut, and the ordinary Pacer-spec transmission.

The VG series Pacers were also the first and last to be offered in the Hardtop body style, of which three were optioned with the E31 package and three were optioned with E35 package. No VG Pacer Hardtops were available with the E34 option. Due to Chrysler Australia's policy (local content law/government law) of using only locally produced components, and the unavailability of a local four-speed gearbox, the Pacer was offered with only a three-speed floor shift manual transmission.

A total of 46,374 VG Valiants were built.

== Fourth generation ==
=== VH Series ===
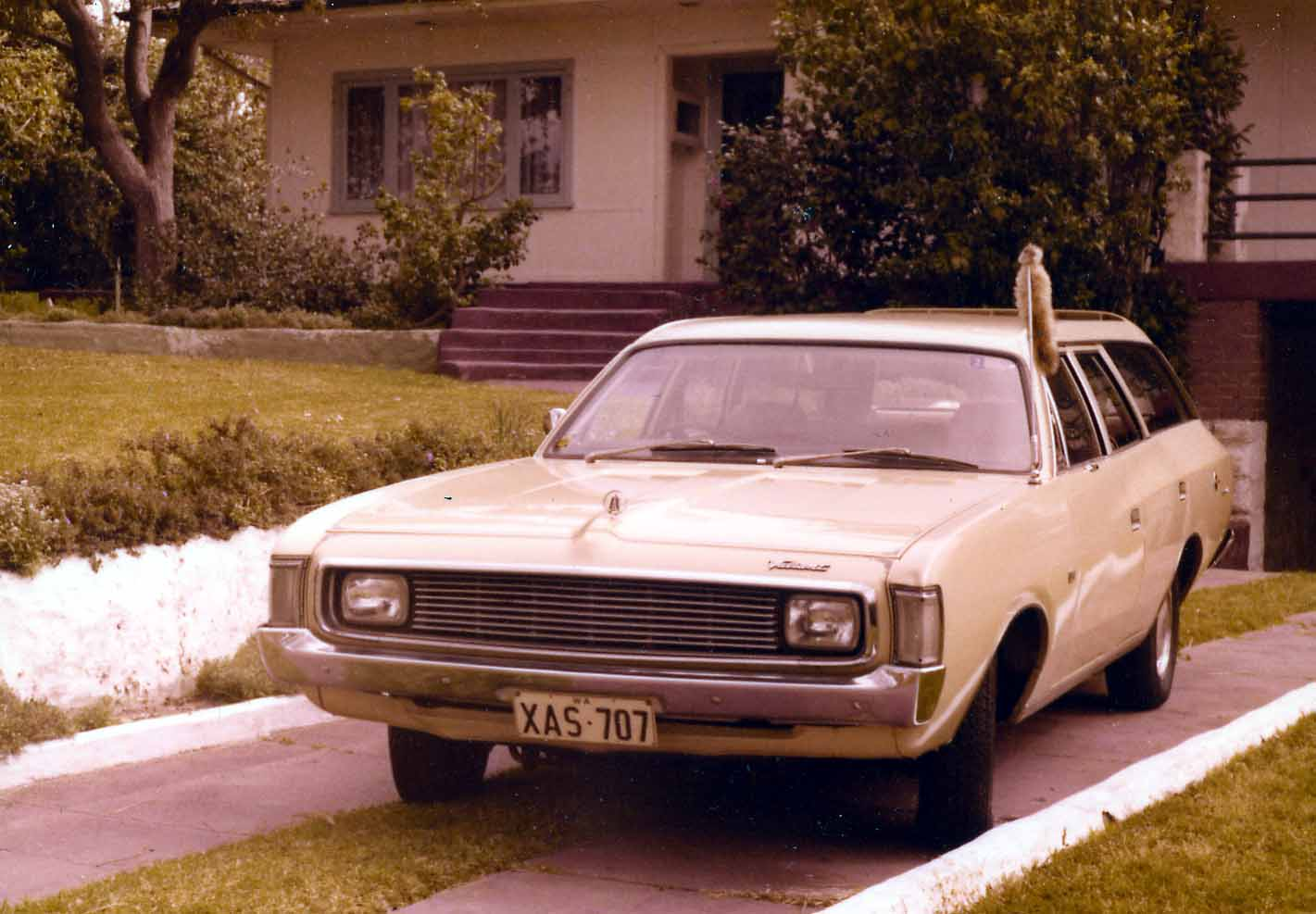
VH Valiant station wagon

Chrysler released the VH Valiant range in June 1971. The VH was designed by Chrysler in the United States with input from Australian engineers to be an Australia-only model range. It was a major change from the preceding VG range – these were larger cars, styled to look even larger than they were. The grille treatment on the new VH range was a direct design descendant from the US Mopars with the central recessed area for grille and headlamps, surrounded by uninterrupted trim on the outer leading edge of the whole assembly. The rectangular headlamps were carried over from the VG model.

The model range of the VH Valiant was quite extensive, starting with the new entry-level Valiant Ranger, and progressing to Valiant Ranger XL, Valiant Pacer, Valiant Regal, and Valiant Regal 770.

Carried over from the VG range, the basic Hemi-6 245ci engine was standard equipment for Ranger XL and Regal, but a new 265 cu in (4.3 L) version offered 203 bhp (151 kW) and was standard equipment for the Regal 770. The Fireball 318 V8 engine was still an option, but only available on the Regal 770 sedan. The basic Ranger sedan featured a new low compression Hemi-6 215ci engine that operated on Standard grade petrol. This engine was not available on the other sedan cars in the VH range.

Unlike the VG range, Valiant Pacer was now only available in 4-door sedan form. Apart from vivid paint colours, optional bonnet blackouts and striping, the new Pacer featured a higher performance version of the 265ci engine, with 218 bhp (163 kW) at 4,800 rpm and 273 lbf⋅ft (370 N⋅m) at 3,000 rpm. The Pacer could run the quarter-mile in 15.9 seconds, get to 100 km/h in 7.6 seconds and reach a top speed of 185 km/h.

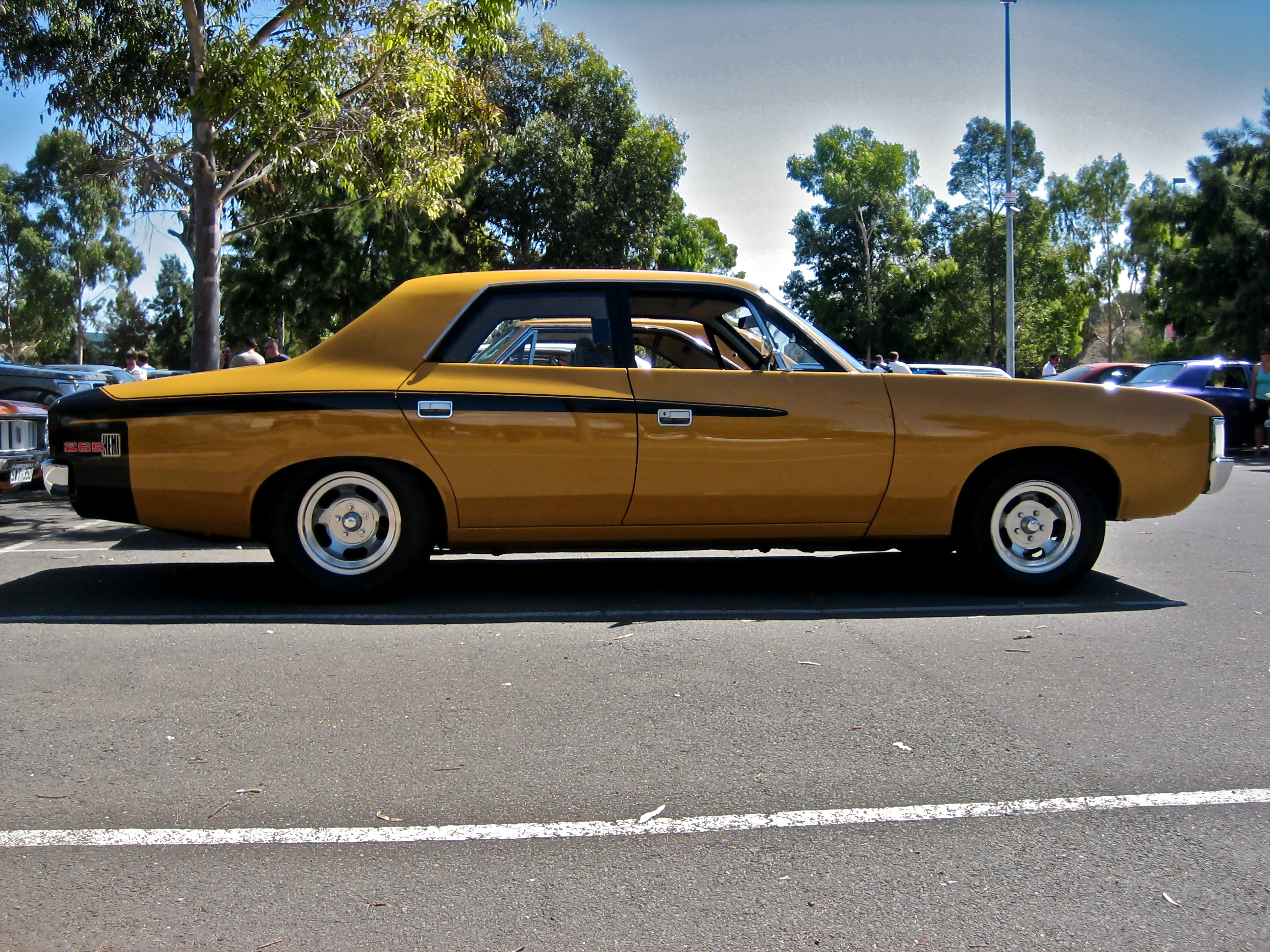
VH Valiant Pacer

In fact, at its release, the VH Valiant Pacer set the record for being the fastest mass-produced four-door sedan with a six-cylinder engine manufactured in Australia, a record which stood for 17 years.

The Pacer's days as the VH performance model were numbered, because that same year saw the announcement and introduction of what was to become Chrysler Australia's most recognised new car – the Valiant Charger. In total, only 1,647 VH Valiant Pacer sedans were produced.

The new Valiant Charger was unlike anything that had come before and it had the Australian motoring press calling it, "...the most handsome car Chrysler has ever produced, and probably the best looking car ever produced by an Australian manufacturer". A short-wheelbase, fastback coupe with an aggressive wedge-like stance, the Charger's design gave the effect of speed, even when it was standing still.

Chrysler's TV campaign for the Charger featured the young adults at whom it was targeted, waving at one as it swept by them and shouting "Hey, Charger!" One of the more memorable TV ads of the time, it created a cliché that haunts today's owners. Charger won Wheels magazine's Car of the Year award for 1971 and was widely acclaimed by others in the motoring press, as well as the public.

The Valiant Charger came in four model guises, closely mirroring the existing sedan range – Charger, Charger XL, Charger 770, and Charger R/T. The first of the serious "track pack" R/T Chargers had option E38. Despite being hampered by a three-speed gearbox, it still drew favourable comments from Wheels: "We achieved a time of 14.8 seconds for the quarter-mile – on smoother surfaces the Charger galloped away so easily that a best of 14.5 seconds is within reach". Being a three-speed gearbox, these quarter-mile runs took only one gear change.

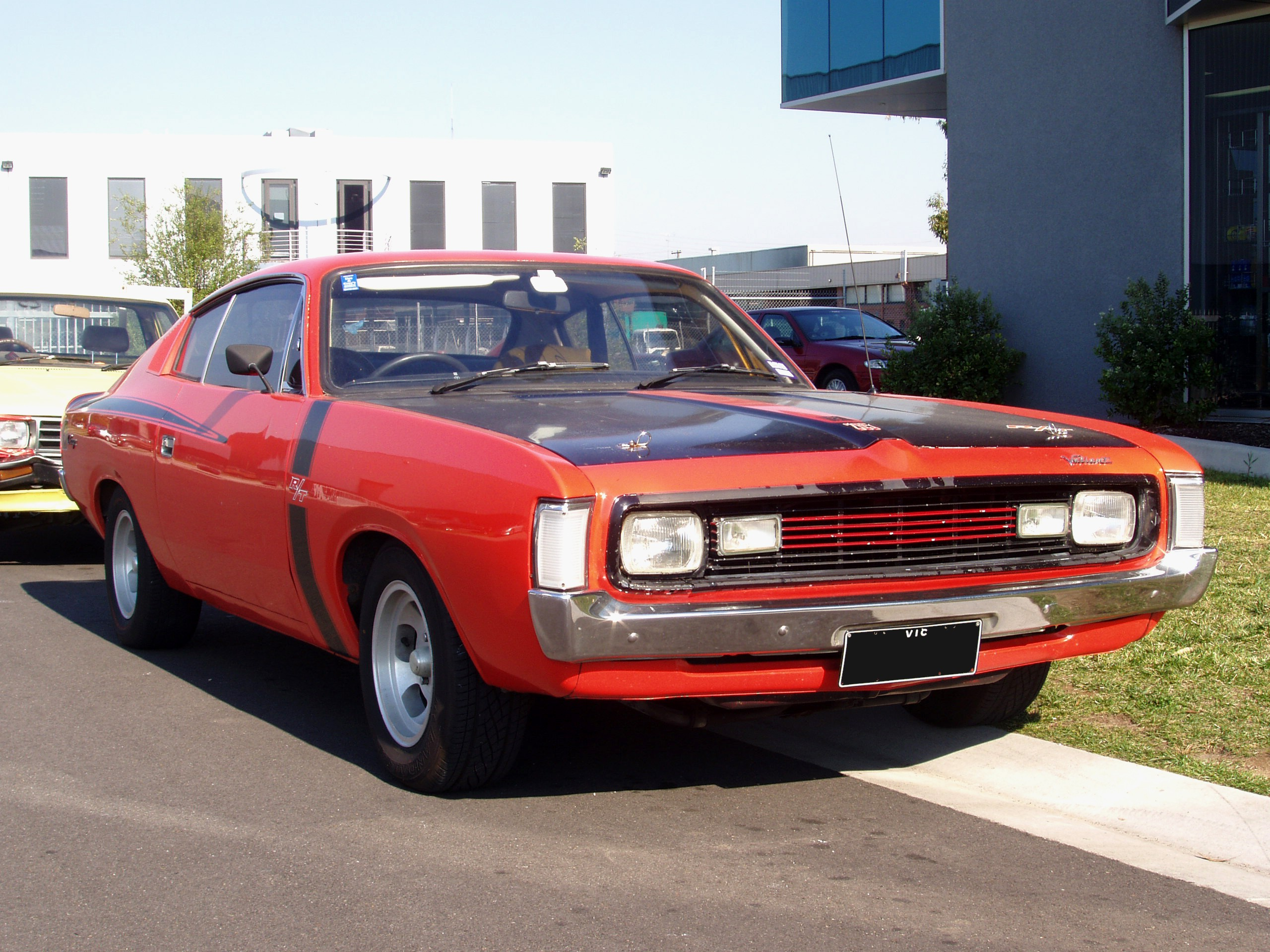
VH Valiant Charger R/T Six Pack coupe

The most recognised performance Chargers were the Six Pack cars. The term six pack denoted the triple side-draught Weber 2BBL carburettors with which the 265 Hemi-6 engine – in option E37, option E38, and later option E49 – produced levels of power unheard of on a naturally aspirated six-cylinder at the time. The triple carburettors also made for a distinctive throaty note when under acceleration.

E38 versions of the Charger R/T featured a 265 Hemi-6 which produced 280 bhp (209 kW) while the E37 was the street tune option made available on Charger 770 and Charger R/T. E38 was a race-ready Charger R/T with the additional A84 Track Pack option, which included a 35-imperial-gallon (160 L) fuel tank. There was also an A87 Track Pack option that included all the race track goodies, but for the larger fuel tank.

In mid-1972, the E38 option was superseded by the more powerful and greatly refined four-speed transmission E49 option. This drew comments from Wheels such as, "The raw quivering power is instantaneously on tap and with a ratio for every conceivable situation the Charger just storms through. It would take a Ferrari Daytona with racing driver Jackie Ickx at the wheel to stay with one". All E49s came with a Track Pack, 21 of which featured the huge fuel tank with dual fillers. The E49 six pack engine came with a baffled sump, tuned length headers, special shot-peened crankshaft, connecting rods, pistons, rings, cam, valve springs, a twin plate clutch and of course the triple 45 mm dual throat Weber carburetors. Chrysler quoted this engine as producing 302 bhp (225 kW), with the car weighing 1,372 kg (3,025 lb).

The R/T E49 was the ultimate Valiant Charger, and with only 149 built the E49s are still widely considered today as one of the greatest Australian "muscle" cars ever produced. Road tests of the era recorded quarter-mile times of between 14.1 and 14.5 seconds. 0 to 100 mph (161 km/h) in 14.1 seconds was the norm. This compares to times of 14.6 for the next quickest accelerating Australian muscle car, the Ford XY Falcon GT-HO (Phase III).

Although the Six Pack Chargers were the dominant performance players in the VH range, there was another Charger, the 275 bhp (205 kW), 340 cu in (5.6 L) V8 powered E55, that came close. Option E55 was applied to the new Charger 770 SE in August 1972, and this car could reach 60 mph (97 km/h) in 7.2 seconds and complete the quarter-mile in 15.5 seconds – all topped off by a top speed of 122 mph (196 km/h).

A batch of several hundred VH Charger 770 318 V8s were exported to Japan along with CH sedans. The Chargers had a CH-like nose with VH sheet metal surrounding the CH four headlights and grille, a combination that NZ assembler Todd Motors would later use to create its unique VJ Valiant Regal 770 sedan. The Japanese cars also had air conditioning, side marker lights and separate white reversing lights as well as mirrors conforming to Japanese market regulations.

Overall, Chrysler Australia manufactured 67,800 VH Valiant cars.

New Zealand distributor Todd Motors had assembled the Valiant sedan from CKD kits since the AP5, mostly following the Australian range though with fewer variants and engine choices plus local upholstery. For the VH, it was a little more adventurous, launching a unique-to-NZ Ranger XL sedan as the base model with a two-barrel carburetor version of the 245ci Hemi-6 engine, no tail lamp trim surrounds or door window brightwork, unique seats and upholstery, and manual or automatic, column-shift transmission. The Regal 770 had the 265ci Hemi-6, floor-console automatic shifter, round dials with wood trim in place of the strip speedo and its own unique front bucket seats and trim. The 318ci V8 was optional and a vinyl roof was standard but could be deleted to order. Todd's sole locally built Charger model was also to '770' trim with the 265ci Hemi-6 six and three-speed floor shift auto and did not have the bumper overriders standard in Australia. Early runs had one-piece front door glass and hinged opening rear side windows but, due to problems with water leaks and excessive wind noise, this was soon changed to opening front quarterlights and fixed rear side glass. Wagons were imported from Australia, to Australian specification.

VH Valiants were assembled at Silverton, near Pretoria in South Africa using Australian bodies, electrics and trim and locally sourced mechanical components including a 225 cid engine. Prior to 1971 South African Valiants had been sourced from Canada.

=== CH Series ===
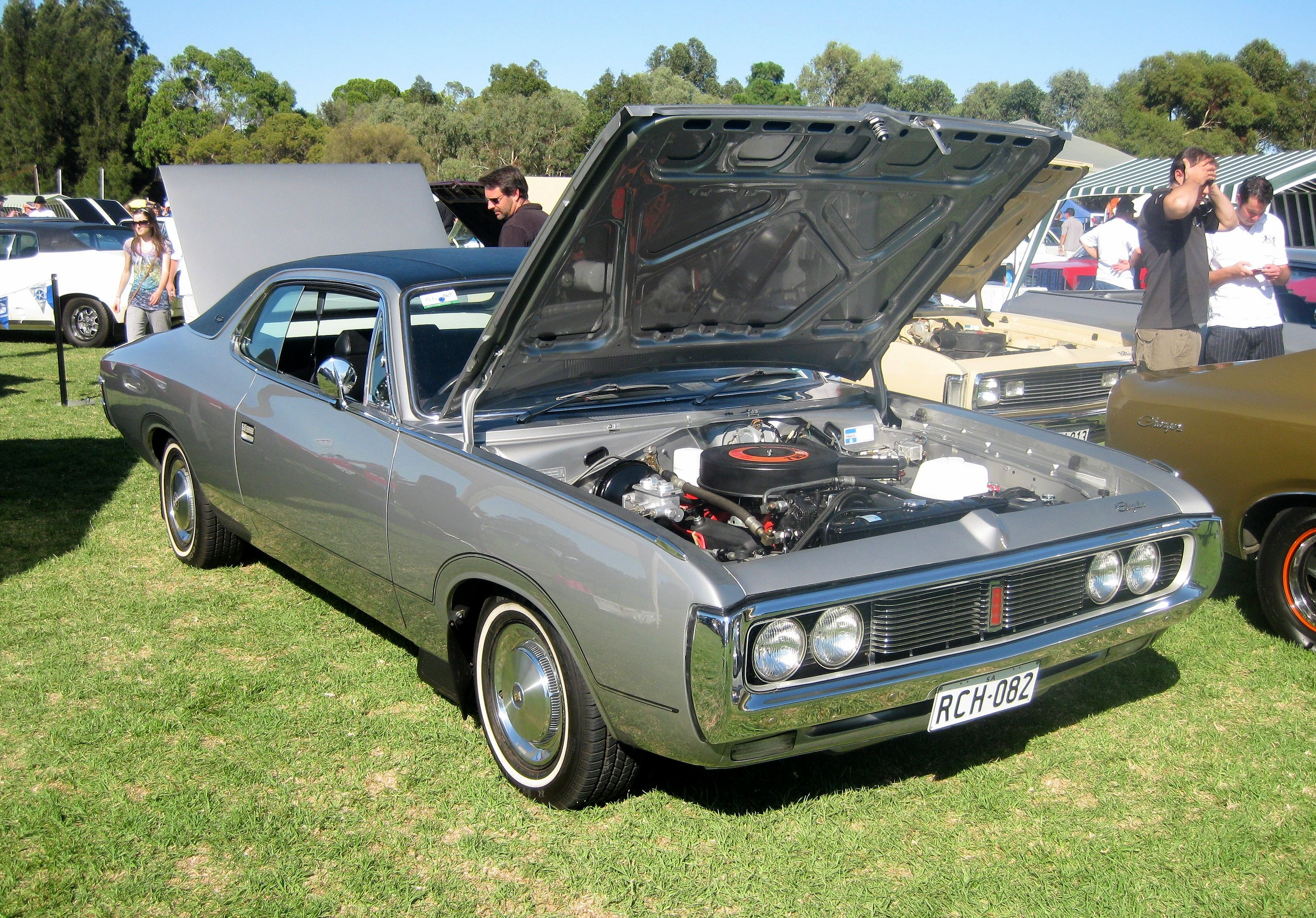
CH Chrysler hardtop

The VH model range also saw the introduction of the new luxury class vehicles, the CH range. The CH was a further 4 inches (100 mm) longer in the wheelbase than the VH Valiant – 115 in (2,900 mm) – with a total length of 197 in (5,000 mm). It featured quad round headlamps and a different rear end treatment, and had quieter suspension and higher equipment levels.

The CH (or "Chrysler by Chrysler", as it is commonly referred to) was a four-door luxury model intended to compete with the Ford Fairlane and Holden's Statesman models in the luxury car market in Australia.

Also released in October 1971 was a two-door version of the CH which was called the Chrysler Hardtop, and shared the same wheelbase as the four-door Chrysler, along with the front and rear end treatment.

=== VJ Series ===
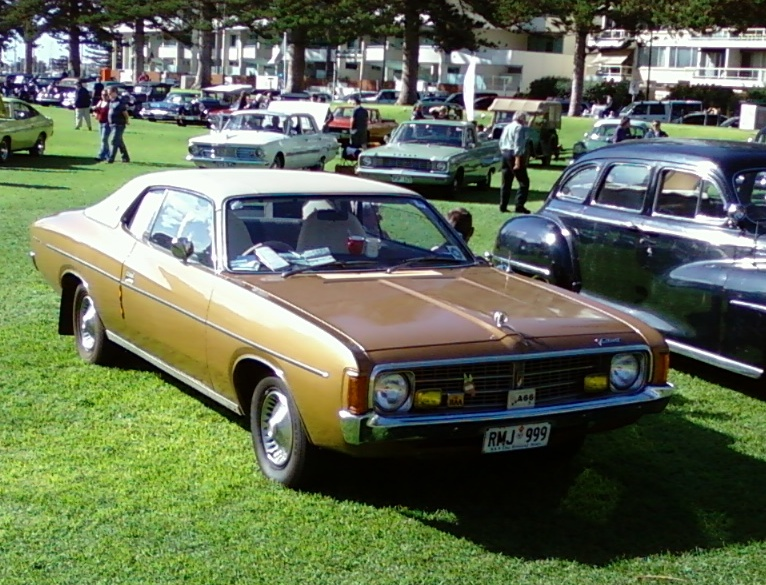
VJ Valiant Regal hardtop

In response to the poor sales and negative perception of the VH styling, the Australian and U.S. styling teams worked on modifications of the VH body, but the combination of local sales and financial problems with Chrysler around the world meant there was no money to fund major sheet metal changes and plans were shelved. May 1973 saw the introduction of the next model in the new All-Australian designed Valiant – The VJ. Although essentially a facelifted version of the VH Valiant before it, the VJ's subtle changes made enough of an impact on the buying public to make it the biggest selling Chrysler Valiant model of all, with 90,865 units being sold.

Externally the VJ Valiant continued on with the VH series body styles, though the VJ reverted to single 7" round headlamps and a new 8-segment grille. VJ sedans also received new horizontal taillights. Although the physical changes were few, many other new features were introduced in the VJ Valiant range, such as electronic ignition, rustproofing and floor-mounted shifters as standard features. Chrysler upgraded equipment levels in July 1974 with front disc brakes, door reflectors, lockable glovebox and retractable seatbelts all as standard features.

While the VJ range still offered sedan, wagon, ute, hardtop and coupe variants, the performance-oriented Pacer sedans and Charger R/T coupes were deleted from the new range. However, a variation of the E37 Six Pack engine (now with four-speed manual transmission) was made available, in the form of option E48, with most of the cars bearing this option ending up being base model VJ Charger coupes. Four VJ Charger coupes were built by special order featuring the VH series option E49 engine. The other carry-over performance variant was option E55, with the 340ci V8 engine option officially remaining as restricted to Charger 770 coupe application only.

In August 1974, a special run of 500 Sportsman coupes were released, based upon the Charger XL model. They were only available in Vintage Red with white body accents. These cars also had a unique white interior with plaid cloth seats and featured a standard 265 engine with a choice of either manual or automatic transmissions.

In New Zealand, Todd Motors was even more adventurous with the VJ. The base Ranger XL and Charger were updated, as in Australia, with similar NZ-only variations as the VH but the VJ Regal 770 was something of a 'parts bin special' and essentially a merger of a VJ Regal with a CH Chrysler. The nose – also used for several hundred VH Chargers built for the Japanese market – combined the CH's four headlamps and grille with VH Valiant sheetmetal (retaining the older, larger, clear park/indicator lamps) while the rest of the body was as per Australian VJ. Inside, new front seats were CH style, with individual chairs forming a bench shape, and a column automatic shifter was now used. Earlier cars had all-vinyl upholstery but cloth was fitted as standard later. New Zealand VJ Regals also had a vinyl roof in black or beige and the panel between the tail lights was also trimmed in vinyl to match – the vinyl trim could be deleted to order.

=== CJ Series ===
The Chrysler was given a facelift in May 1973 to become the CJ Series. The two-door hardtop was dropped leaving only the four-door sedan to carry on the fight against its Ford and Statesman luxury competitors. The related Valiant hardtop's production continued.

=== VK Series ===
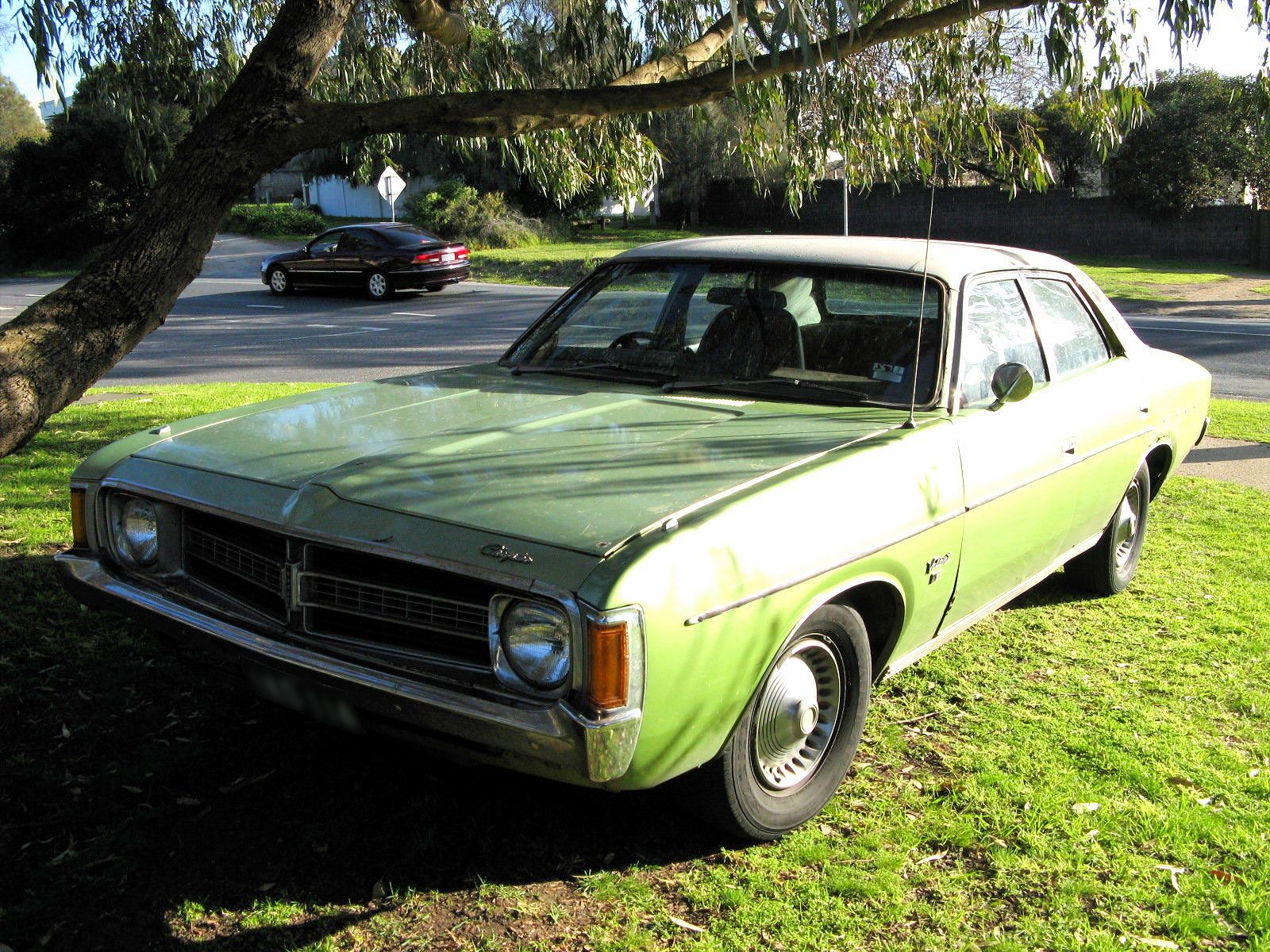
VK Valiant Regal sedan

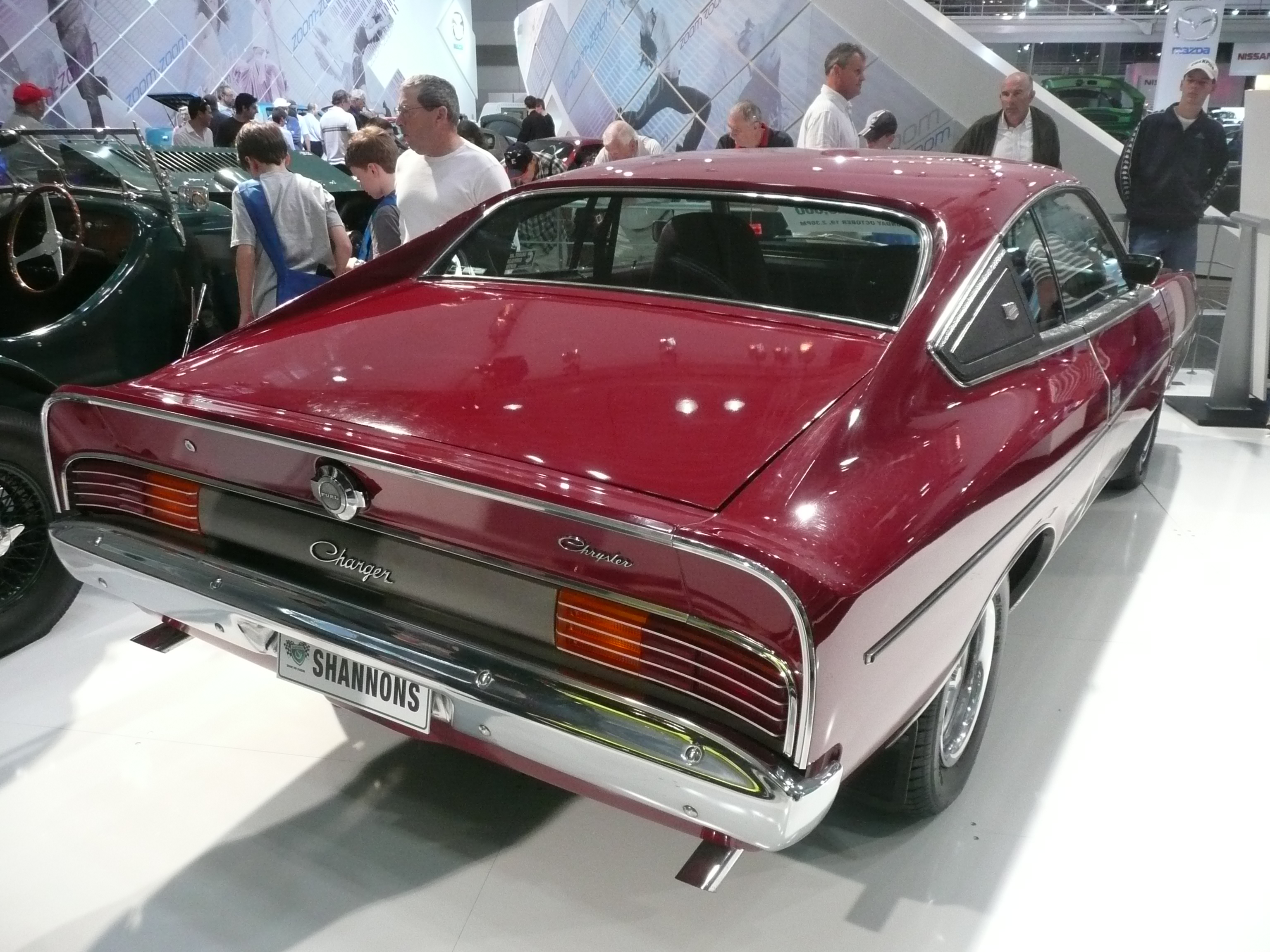
VK Charger 770 coupe

In October 1975 the VK Valiant was released with few external changes from the previous VJ model. The Ranger now had an argent version of the VJ Charger grille, the Charger XL had a white version and the Charger 770 also had the argent grille. The VK Valiant Regal featured a "grille within a grille". The Ranger sedan, Regal sedan, and Charger all now shared the same tail-light treatment, using a horizontal layout with four chrome contours to keep air flow away and keep the lenses clean. The Chargers were not called Chrysler Valiant Chargers any longer; with the 'Valiant' name being dropped.

The VK Regal also had blinker repeaters housed in small chrome boxes which sat on top of both front guards. Another unusual option was the Fuel Pacer option from the Chrysler US parts bin which detected low engine vacuum – as under hard acceleration – and illuminated the driver side guardtop blinker repeater to indicate wasteful driving. Inertia-reel seatbelts and slightly different heater controls were introduced on the VK, as well as a combination control stalk for the lights and wipers from the Mitsubishi Galant. The Ranger also got full-length door trims, and carpet was now standard.

VK six-cylinder series engines were the same as the VJ's, and the 245 Hemi-6 now featured a two-barrel carburettor like the 265 variant. The V8s were mainly 318 cu in (5.2 L) units, though the 360 cu in (5.9 L) remained an option across the entire range. It was not very popular as the mid-1970s saw the trend towards smaller cars with smaller motors. While the "three on the tree" column shift manual gearbox was still available, it was rarely specified (although still popular on Utes) and the three-speed floor change was now gone too. Buyers seeking floor-shift manual could choose the four-speed, which was available on all models but could only be had with a Hemi-6, not with a V8.

Late in the VK model run a limited edition Charger called the White Knight Special (option A50) was offered with a factory-fitted front air dam. The changes were mainly cosmetic with running gear being largely stock. There were 200 White Knight Specials made – 100 Arctic White and 100 Amarante Red. 120 were automatics and 80 were four-speeds.

20,555 VK Valiants were produced and production ceased in June 1976. This was because ADR 27A for exhaust emission control became effective on 1 July 1976, and all the car manufacturers used that date as the introduction of a new model to comply with the new standard.

VK assembly did not begin in New Zealand until nearly a year after Australian launch because a 60% sales tax levied on large engine cars, introduced during the 1973-4 oil crisis, drastically slowed VJ sales. The model range in New Zealand was pared down to Regal and Regal 770 editions.

A version of the Regal was manufactured for the South African Police as the SPP package in the late 1970s which featured triple carburetors, an uprated gearbox, uprated differential, and larger disc brakes. Approximately 2000 of this version were built and supplied

=== CK Series ===
The Chrysler was given a slight a facelift in October 1975 to become the CK series. Production ceased just one year later in October 1976 when the Chrysler was replaced by the Chrysler Regal SE, a prestige version of the CL Series Valiant.

=== CL Series ===
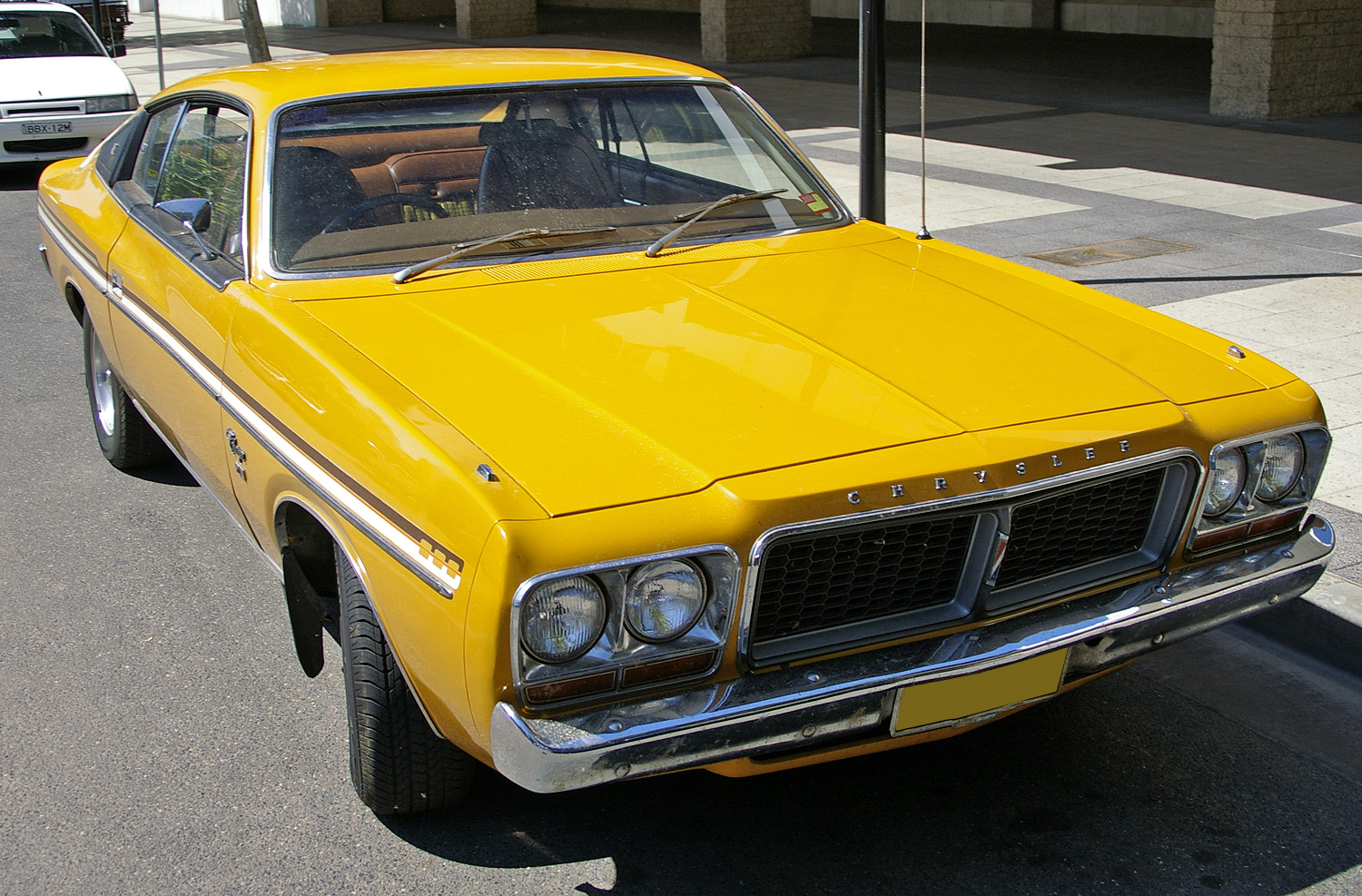
CL Charger 770 coupe

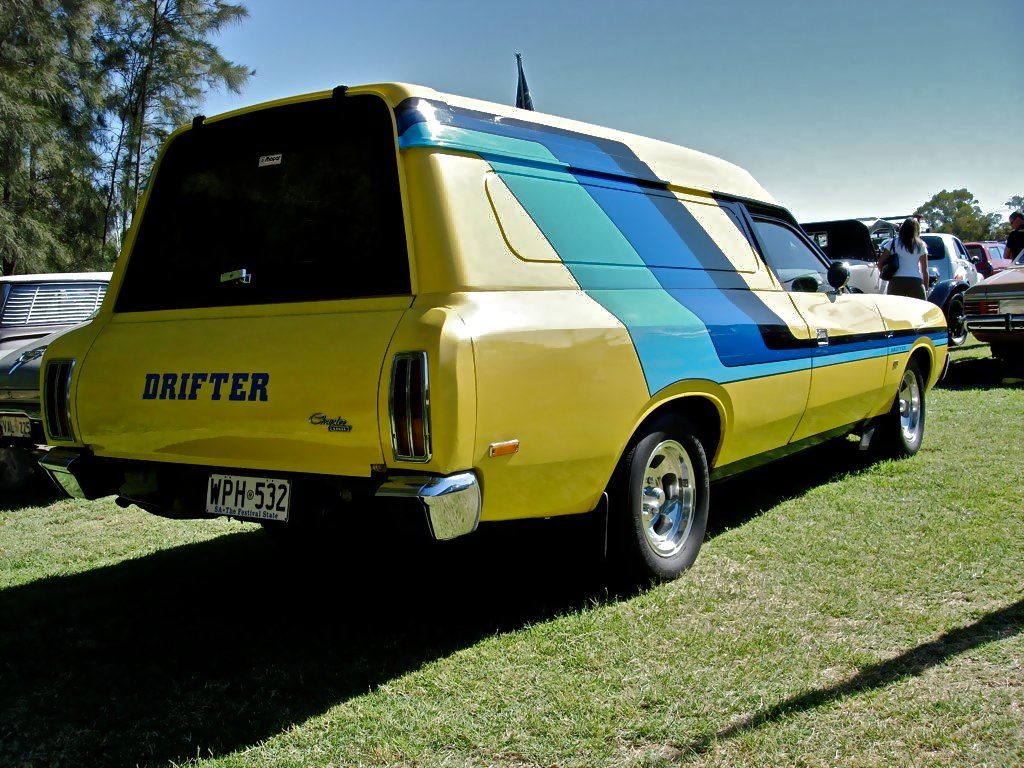
1976-1978 CL Drifter van

The CL Series Valiant was introduced in November 1976. Although it used the same bodyshell as the previous VK range, the front and rear ends were restyled. The front end used horizontally arrayed quad round headlamps flanking a central grille. The front guards and bonnet were also reworked accordingly. The new bootlid's curved leading edge flowed down to new taillights that sandwiched a simple centre garnish panel. The bumpers, however, were the same units as had been used on the 1969 VF series Valiants.

The Ranger name was dropped; the base model CL was simply called Valiant, and the long-wheelbase "Chrysler by Chrysler" was replaced by the Regal SE. The CL series Regal was marketed as the Chrysler Regal, in contrast to the Valiant Regal name used from the AP5 series through to the recently superseded VK Series. The CL series was the last to include a Charger model, which – like the previous VK model – was badged and sold as a Chrysler, not as a Valiant submodel. The CL Charger was generally available in only one trim level, the Charger 770, though a Charger XL was made available to police departments. The CL series also saw the arrival of the panel van variant to compete with similar offerings from rival makers.

Interiors carried over largely unchanged from the VK range, though the Regal SE offered luxurious buttoned-leather seating as an option. Base Valiants continued with the previous Ranger style strip speedometer, while the Regal dash featured recessed circular gauges and clock with a woodgrain finish. The Charger 770 dash was similar to that of the Regal, except it was finished in black and had a tachometer instead of a clock.

The 3.5 L (215 cu in) Hemi-6 and 5.9 L (360 cu in) V8 were dropped, and the only engine options were low- and high-compression versions of the 4.0 L (245 cu in) Hemi-6 and the 5.2 L (318 cu in) V8. The CL's introduction had closely coincided with that of the strict exhaust emission regulations contained in ADR 27A. With the 318 engine, a new emissions control system was introduced: Electronic Lean Burn.

Transmission options were 3-speed manual with floor or column shift, four-speed manual with floor shift, and three-speed Torqueflite automatic with floor or column shift. The automatic was standard equipment with the 318 V8, and optional with a 6-cylinder. The 4-speed was optional for six- and eight-cylinder models. The floor-shift auto option was fitted to most Regals and all Regal SE's.

In 1978 Chrysler released a limited edition run of 400 special Regal Le Baron models (option A17). The Le Baron was available only in Silver, with red or blue interiors. The 265 Hemi-6 was standard, and the 318 V8 was optional.

Valiant and Regal sedans also benefited from the 1978 introduction of Radial Tuned Suspension in response to Holden's having marketed their suspension as particularly suited to radial tyres. RTS improved the car's handling and roadholding significantly, and "Modern Motor" magazine proclaimed that the Valiant offered a better drive than the Holden.

The last special option in the CL range was the $816 Drifter package, available on the Charger. The Drifter package included Impact Orange, Sundance Yellow, Spinnaker White or Harvest Gold body paint, and large side and rear stripes. Drifters in white had additional "strobe stripes" on the bootlid. Engine options were again the 265 six or 318 V8, but the 4-speed manual was the only transmission option. A Drifter Pack was also offered on the Valiant Panel Van and on the Utility.

36,672 CL Valiants – including the last-ever Chargers – were built.

The CL was the last Valiant series assembled in New Zealand – by now the Chargers and Ranger were gone and the Regal and the Regal SE, replacing the 770, were the only models. The Regal SE was the first car to be assembled in the country with standard air conditioning.

=== CM series ===
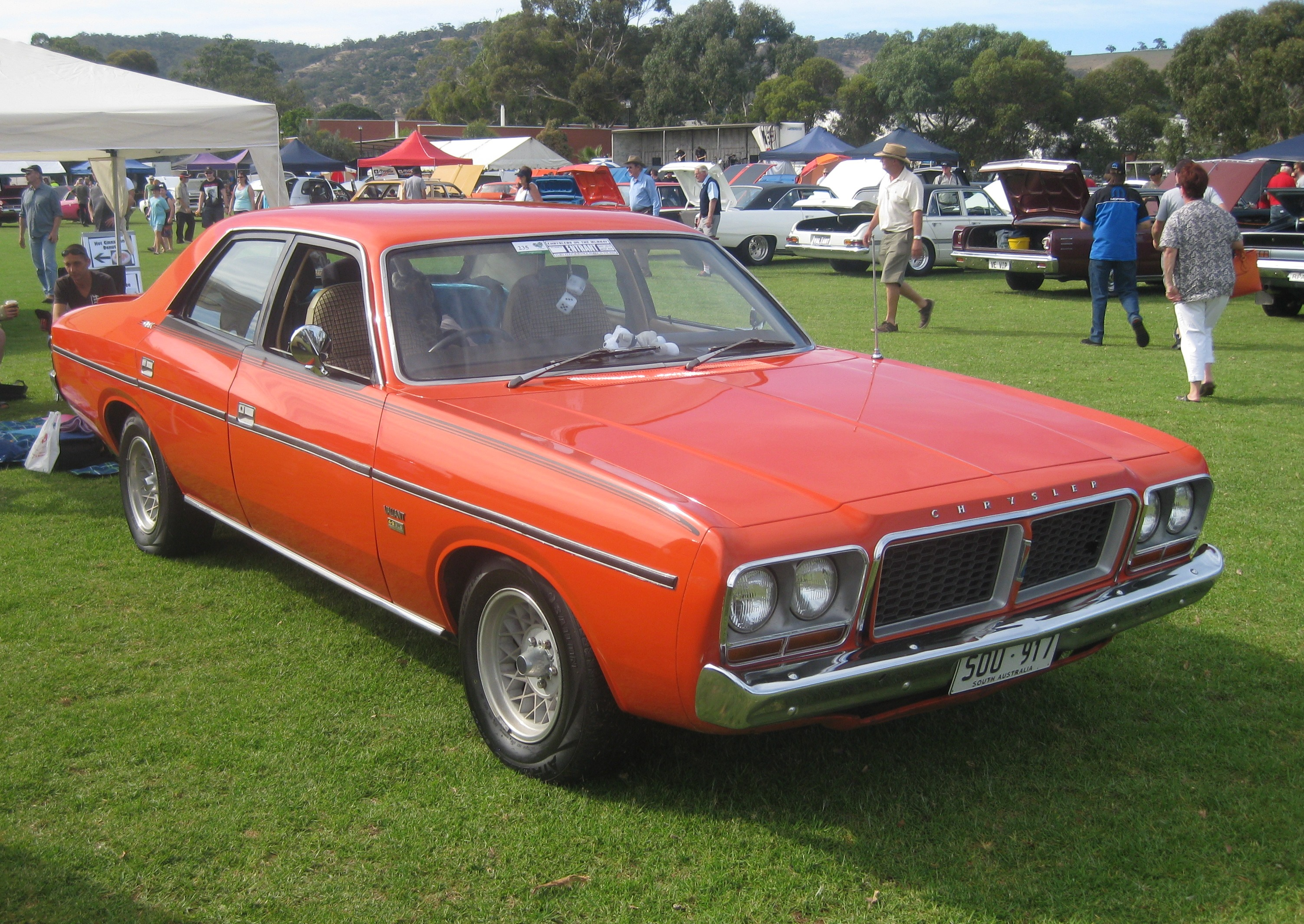
CM Valiant GLX sedan

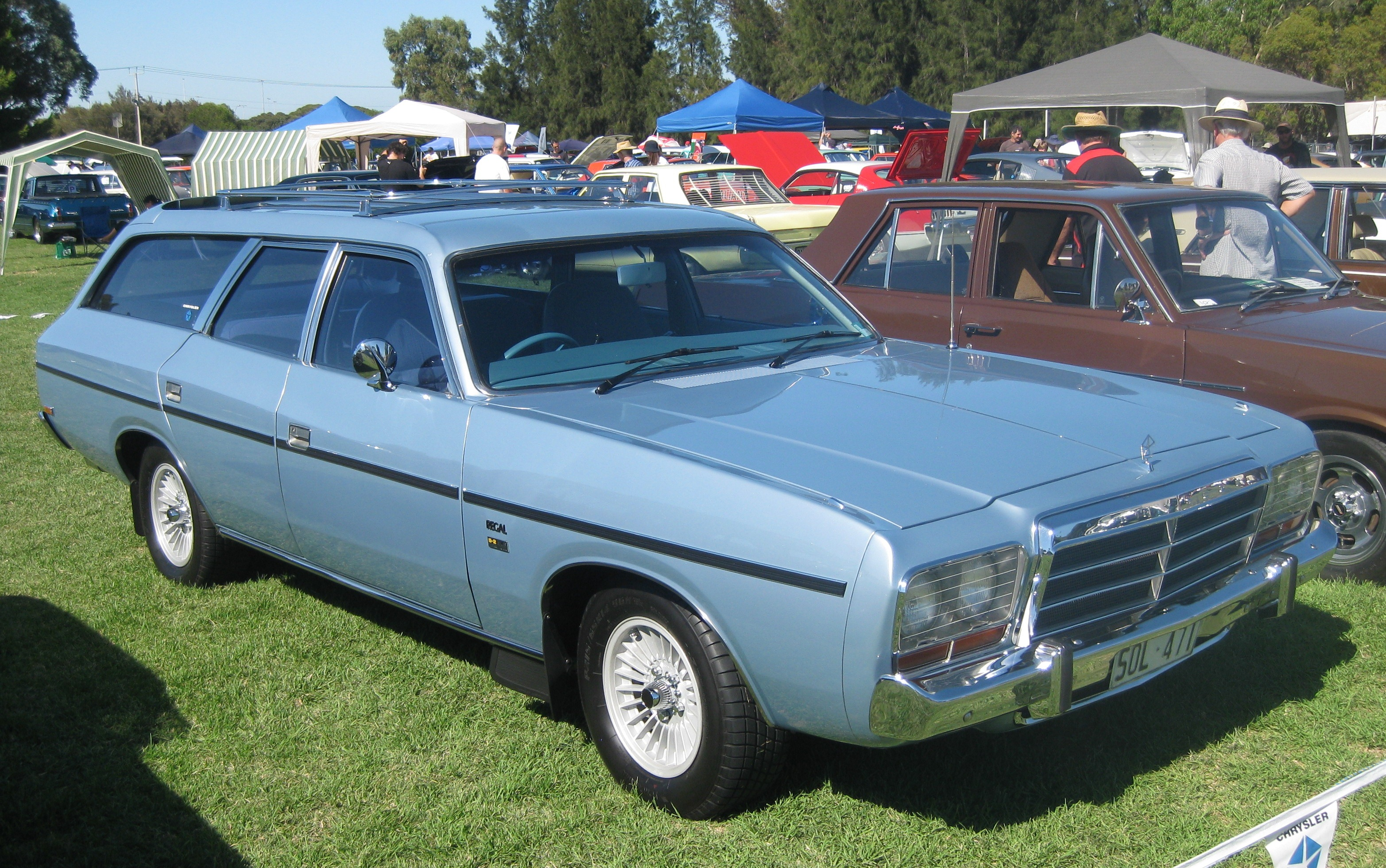
CM Valiant station wagon

The CM was released in November 1978, and was little changed bodywise from the CL model. Only sedan and wagon models were produced.

A sports sedan called the GLX (option A16) was released as a replacement for the discontinued Charger and earlier the Pacer. Its features included a Charger grille and dashboard, special cloth trim, Cheviot Hotwire mag wheels and black door frames. It was advertised as the car "For People Who Like Their Cars Rare", as it was the last of the sports models and the jewel in the CM series. The GLX could be optioned with a 4.3 L (265 cu in) Hemi-6 or 5.2 L (318 cu in) V8.

The computer-controlled Electronic Lean Burn system continued giving favourable fuel economy; when Wheels performed an economy test in 1979, they found the ELB-equipped Valiant 4.0 L (245 cu in) used less fuel than a 2.0 L (120 cu in) Ford Cortina. A Valiant achieved better than 30 miles per imperial gallon (9.4 L/100 km) in the Total Oil Economy Run.

Production of this car continued after Mitsubishi's takeover of Chrysler's Australian operations. Mitsubishi could build the car profitably even in small numbers due to its high 97% level of local Australian content and amortised tooling. However, the car was still badged as the Chrysler Valiant, not as a Mitsubishi. The profit from the sale of one Valiant was equal to the profit from 3 Mitsubishi Sigmas- by this time the company's main seller.

Valiant production ended in August 1981 with production of the CM reaching 16,005 units out of 565,338 units of all models. Eventually, the Mitsubishi Magna was developed to replace both the Sigma and Valiant. Full-sized Chryslers were not marketed again in Australia until the 2005 release of the Chrysler 300C.

== Motorsport ==
Although the Charger is arguably the best remembered Valiant in Australian motorsport, earlier models achieved class wins at the annual "Bathurst 500" production car race, something that the Charger never did. A Valiant AP5 won Class D at the 1963 Armstrong 500, a VC Valiant V8 won Class D at the 1966 Gallaher 500 and a VG Valiant Pacer won Class D at the 1970 Hardie-Ferodo 500. Chargers were raced in the Hardie-Ferodo 500 at Bathurst in 1971 and 1972 with factory support. They gained a best placing of third outright and second in class in 1972. Chrysler's policy was to race "Australian made" product, which meant the race cars ran 4.3 L (265 cu in) six-cylinder engines equipped with triple Weber carburettors and 3-speed gearboxes. Even skilled driving and good engineering could not defeat Ford's legendary Falcon GTHO Phase III with its 351 cu in (5.75 L) V8. In New Zealand, however, the Chryslers proved to be virtually unbeatable from 1971 to 1979 at the famous B&H 500-mile (later 1000 km) series at Pukekohe Park Raceway. The most successful drivers were Leo Leonard and Jim Little, who still races his Valiants (mostly pre-65 class).

== See also ==
- Plymouth Valiant
- Dodge Dart
- Chrysler VIP
- Chrysler by Chrysler
- Chrysler Valiant Charger
- Chrysler Australia
- Mitsubishi Motors Australia Limited
