= Chrysler California Cruiser =

Overview
- Manufacturer: Chrysler
- Production: 2002

Body and chassis
- Class: Concept car
- Body style: 2-door hatchback
- Layout: FF layout

Powertrain
- Engine: 2.4 L turbocharged I4

The Chrysler California Cruiser was a concept car created by Chrysler. It debuted at the 2002 Paris Motor Show, showing the possible future design of the Chrysler PT Cruiser. It also had the ability to convert to a "hotel room" for two.

The California Cruiser used a 2.4 L turbocharged I4 engine producing 215 hp (160 kW). Inside, it featured silver inserts on the door trim, quarter panels, and hatchback trim. The California Cruiser also had an integrated stereo system in the liftgate. The exterior was suited for the average surfer (hence the name, since California is famous for its surfers). The fog lamps on the California Cruiser were a visible difference, although the 2006 PT Cruiser used similar-looking lamps.

== See also ==
- Chrysler PT Cruiser
