= Chrysler 700C =

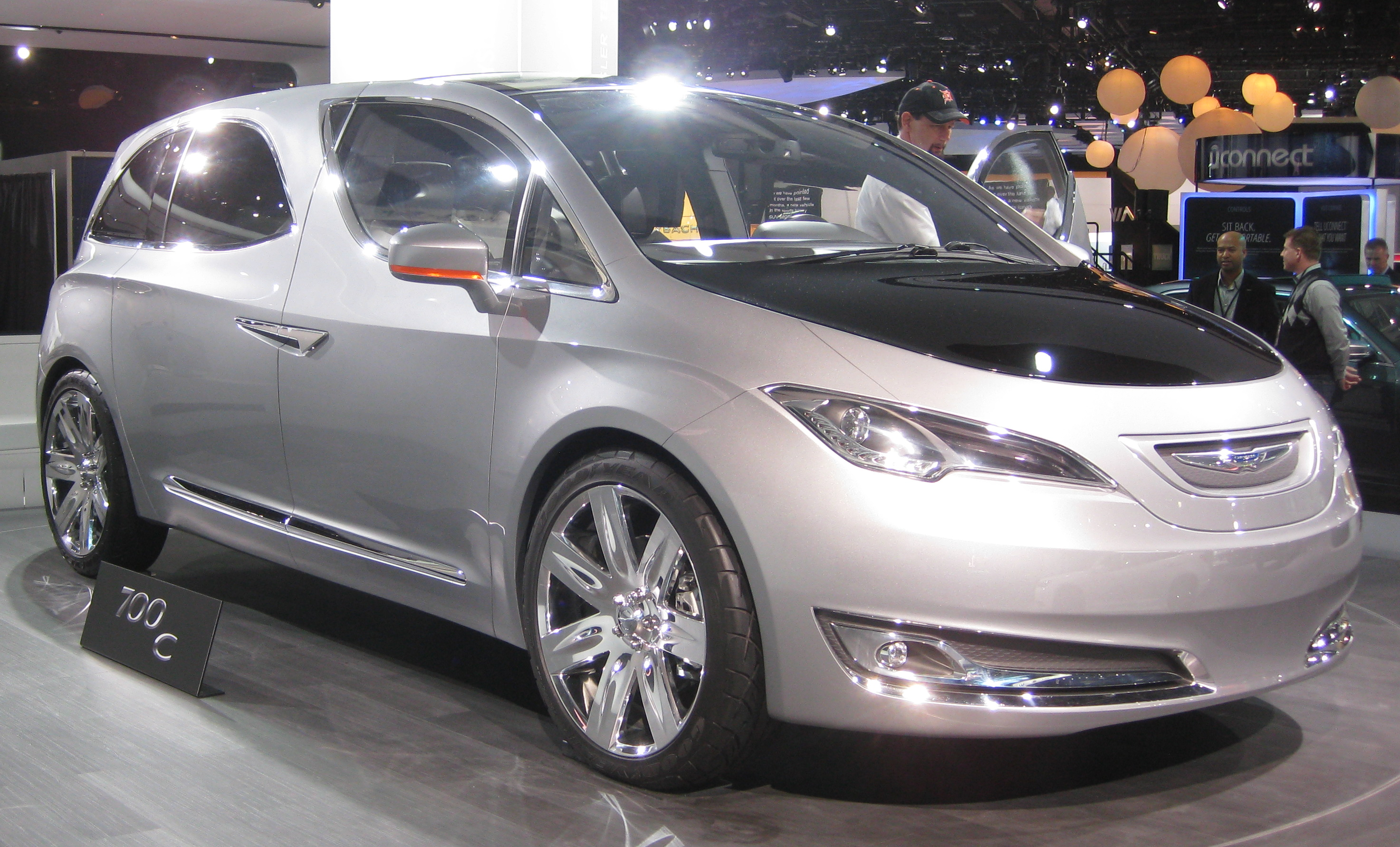

Overview
- Manufacturer: Chrysler Group LLC
- Production: 2012 (concept car)

Body and chassis
- Class: Minivan
- Body style: 4-door minivan

The Chrysler 700C was a concept luxury minivan unveiled at the 2012 North American International Auto Show in Detroit by Chrysler.

It was presented to the public to gauge the public's thoughts on the design as an option to redesign or replace the Chrysler Town and Country minivan. The 2017 Chrysler Pacifica minivan, which replaced the Town & Country, took design cues from this concept car.
