= Chrysler Valiant (VH) =

Australian full-size car

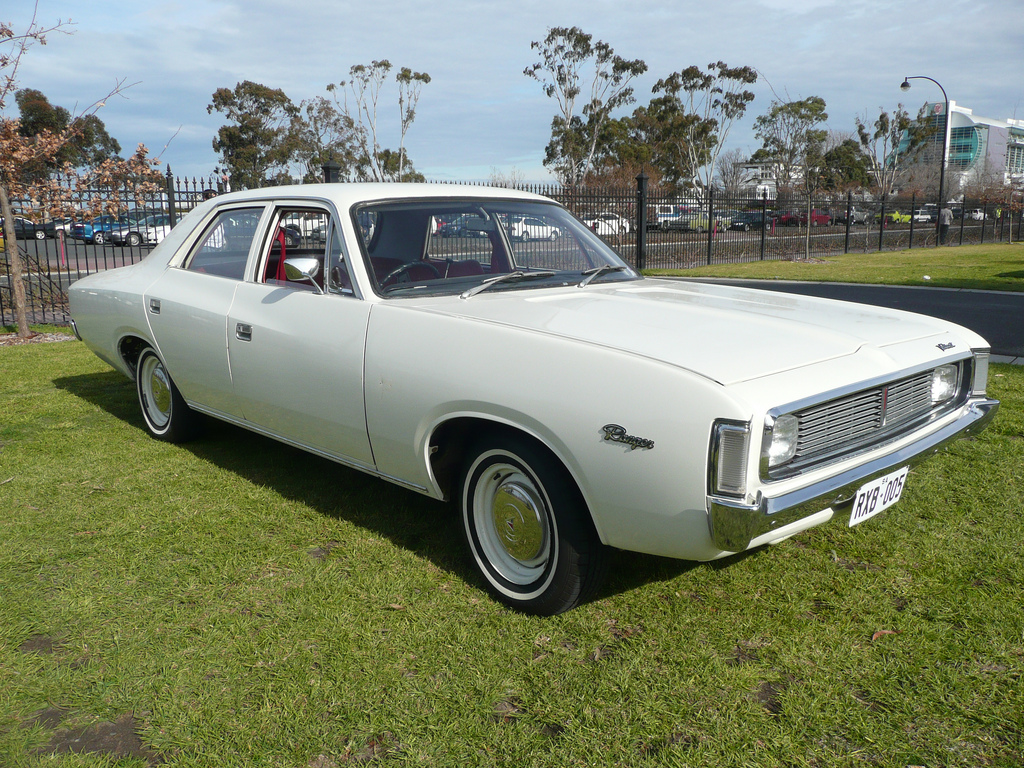
- Chrysler VH Valiant Ranger sedan

Overview
- Manufacturer: Chrysler Australia
- Also called: Dodge Utility; Dodge SE (South Africa)
- Production: June 1971 – March 1973
- Assembly: Australia: Tonsley Park; New Zealand: Petone (Todd Motors); South Africa: Pretoria

Body and chassis
- Body style: 4-door sedan 5-door station wagon 2-door hardtop 2-door coupe 2-door coupe utility
- Layout: FR layout
- Related: Chrysler by Chrysler; Chrysler Valiant Charger

Powertrain
- Engine: 215 cu in (3.5 L) I6; 245 cu in (4.0 L) I6; 265 cu in (4.3 L) I6; 318 cu in (5.2 L) V8; 340 cu in (5.6 L) V8; 225 cu in (3.7 L) I6 (South Africa)
- Transmission: 3-speed manual 4-speed manual 3-speed automatic

Dimensions
- Wheelbase: Sedan: 111 inches (2819 mm)
- Length: Sedan: 192.8 inches (4897 mm)
- Width: 74.2 inches (1885 mm)
- Height: Sedan: 55.9 inches (1420 mm)
- Kerb weight: Hemi 6 Sedan: 3100 lb (1406 kg)

Chronology
- Predecessor: Chrysler VG Valiant
- Successor: Chrysler VJ Valiant

The Chrysler Valiant (VH) is an automobile which was produced by Chrysler Australia from June 1971 to March 1973. It replaced the VG series Valiant and was the first Valiant model to be a uniquely Australian design.

== Model range ==
The VH series Valiant was offered in the following models.

- Valiant sedan
- Valiant Ranger sedan
- Valiant Ranger station wagon
- Valiant Ranger XL sedan
- Valiant Ranger XL station wagon
- Valiant Ranger XL hardtop
- Valiant Hemi Pacer sedan
- Valiant Regal sedan
- Valiant Regal station wagon
- Valiant Regal hardtop
- Valiant Regal 770 sedan
- Valiant Regal 770 hardtop
- Valiant Charger coupe
- Valiant Charger XL coupe
- Valiant Charger R/T coupe
- Valiant Charger 770 coupe
- Valiant Charger 770 SE coupe
- Dodge utility
- Valiant utility
- Valiant Ranger utility

Sedan and station wagon models were introduced in June 1971, followed by the Charger coupes in August, the coupe utility models in September, and the two-door hardtops in November.

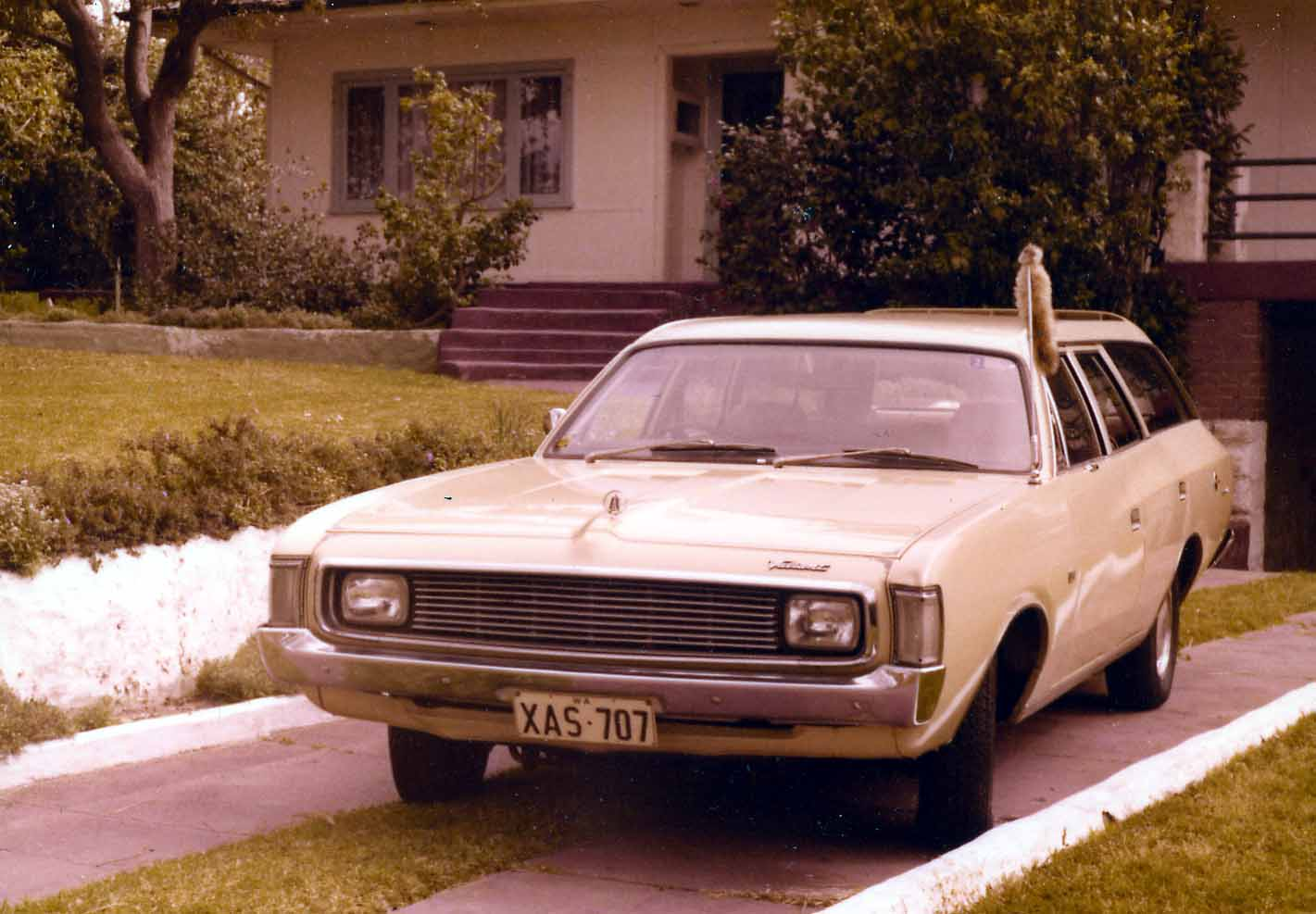
Chrysler VH Valiant Ranger station wagon

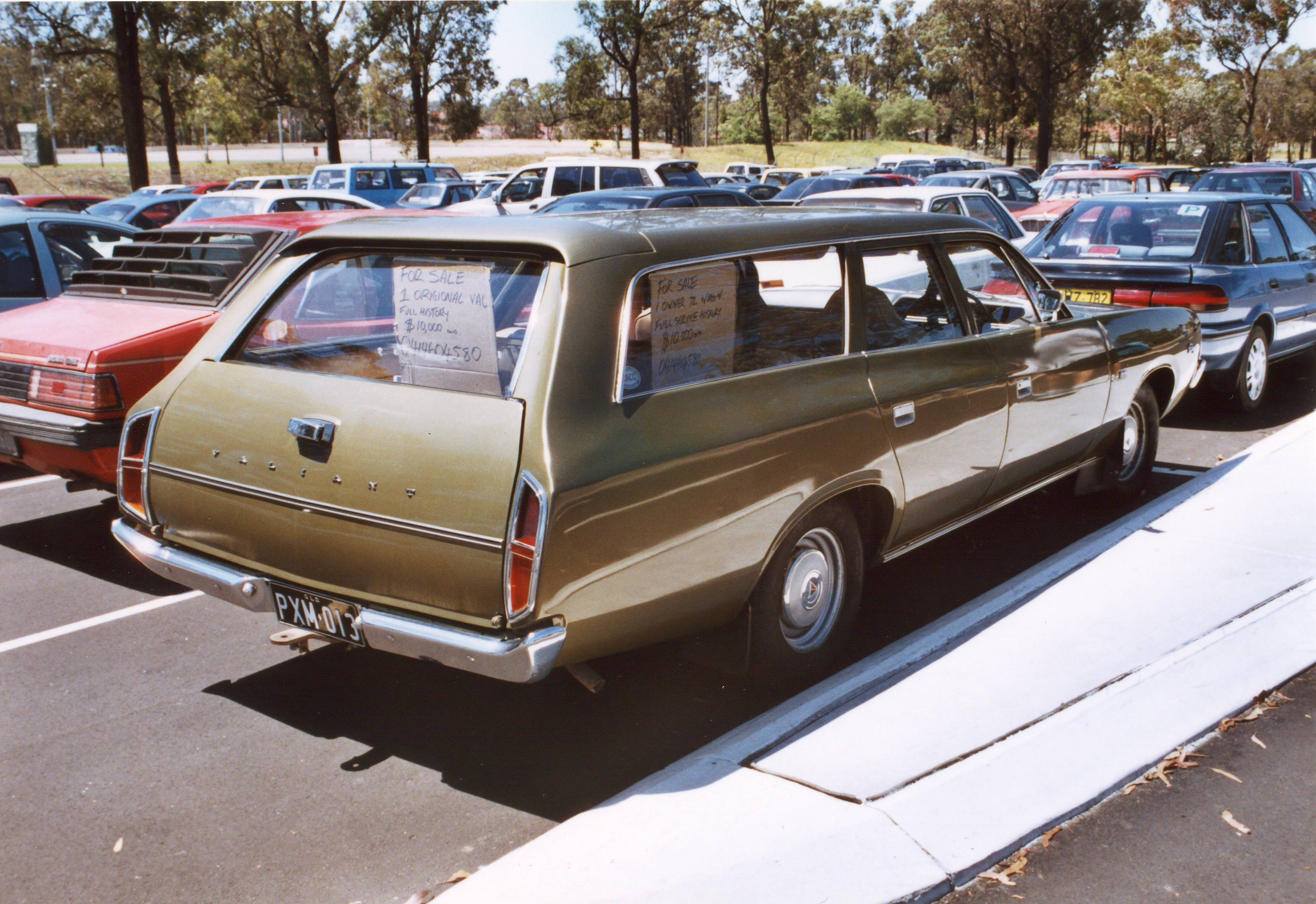
Chrysler VH Valiant Ranger wagon

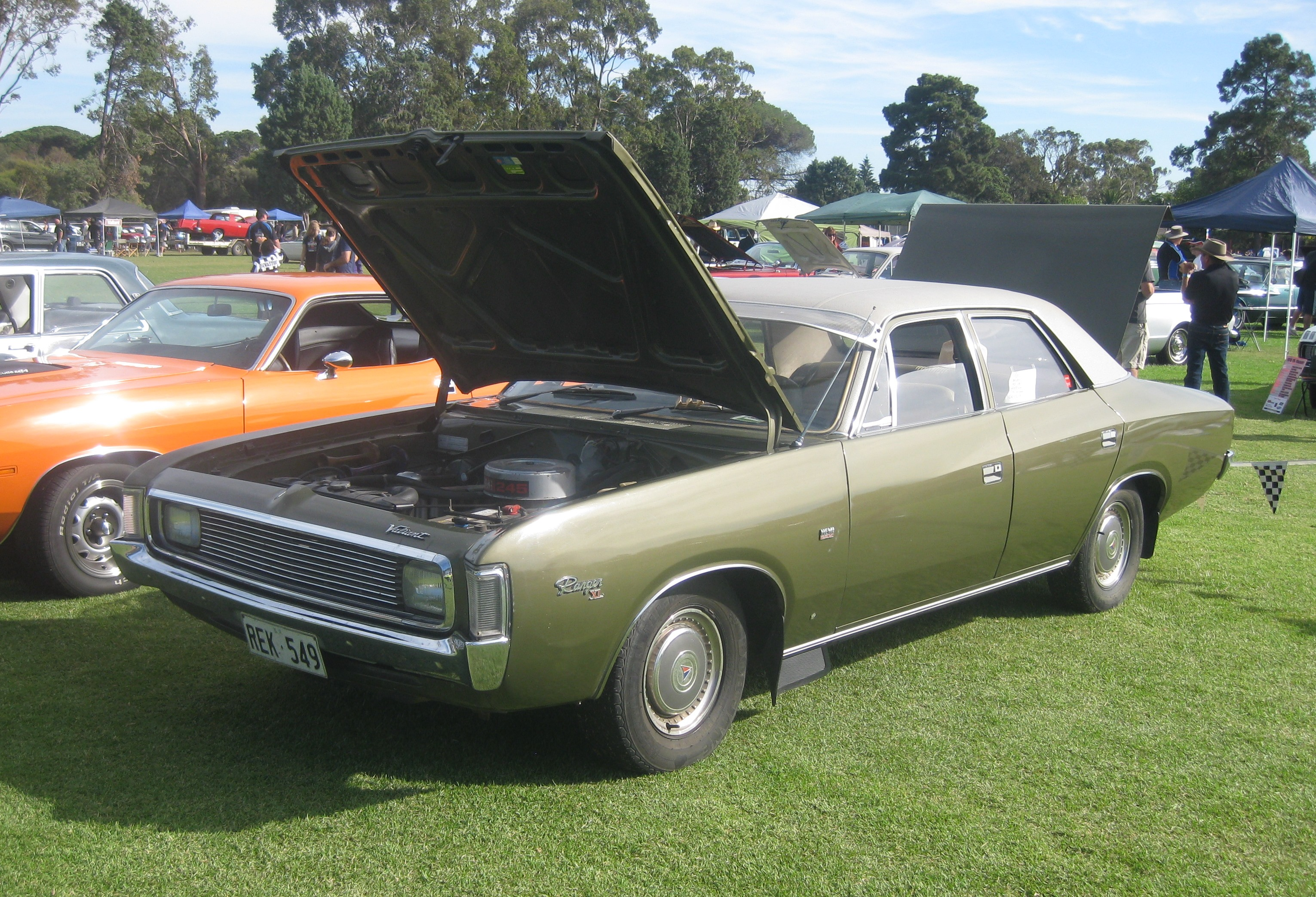
Chrysler VH Valiant Ranger XL sedan

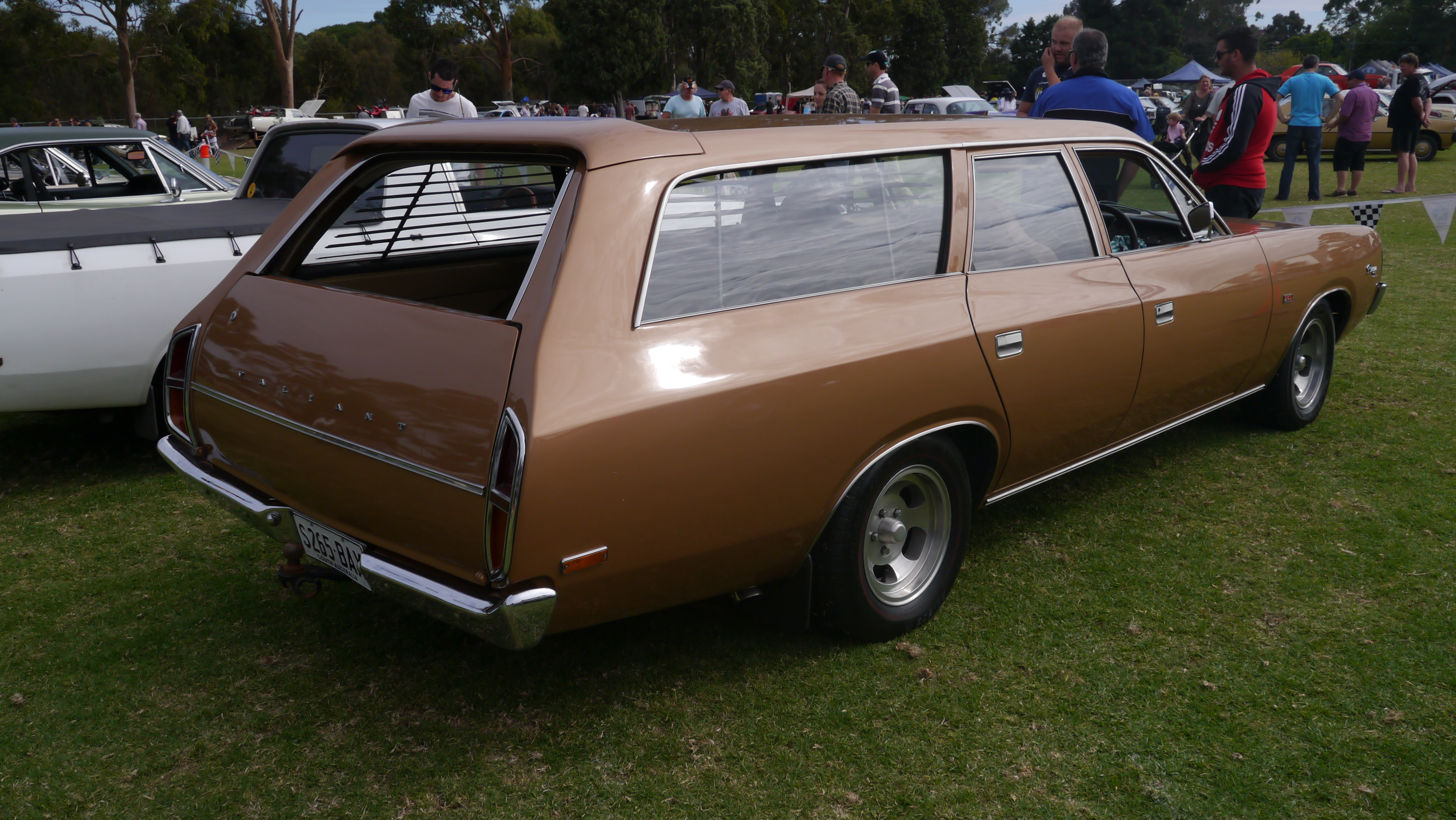
Chrysler VH Valiant Ranger XL wagon

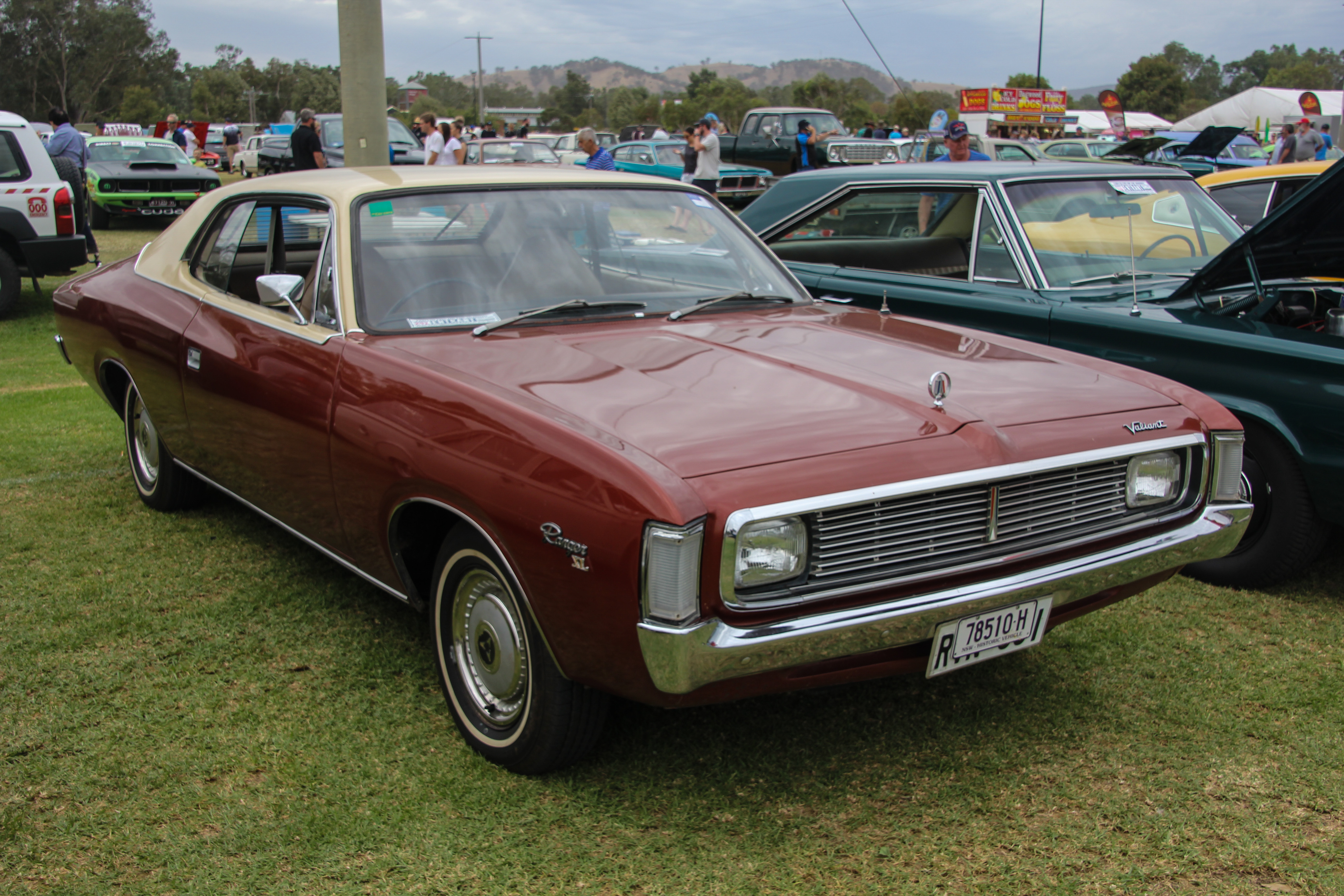
Chrysler VH Valiant Ranger XL hardtop

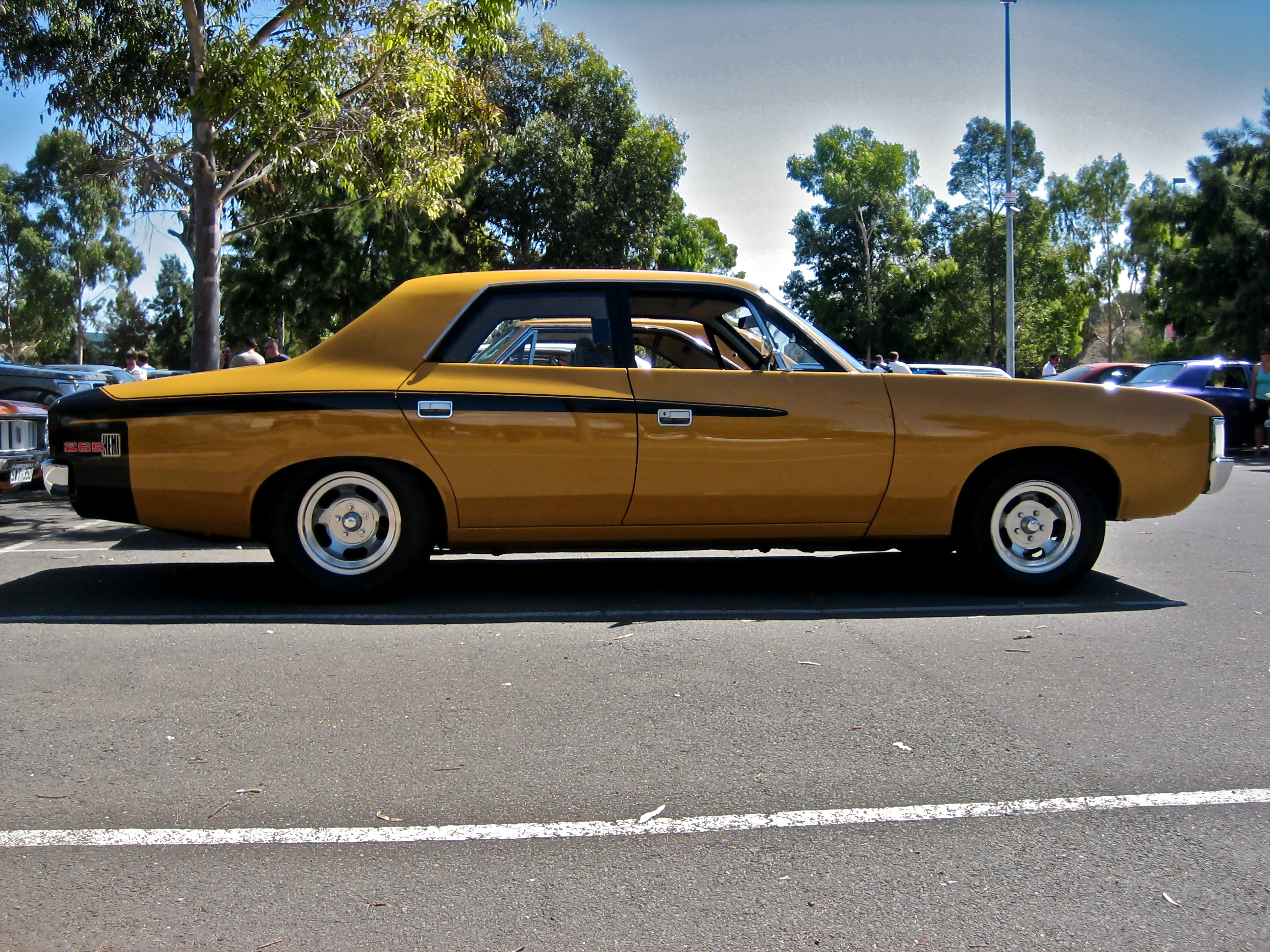
Chrysler VH Valiant Hemi Pacer sedan

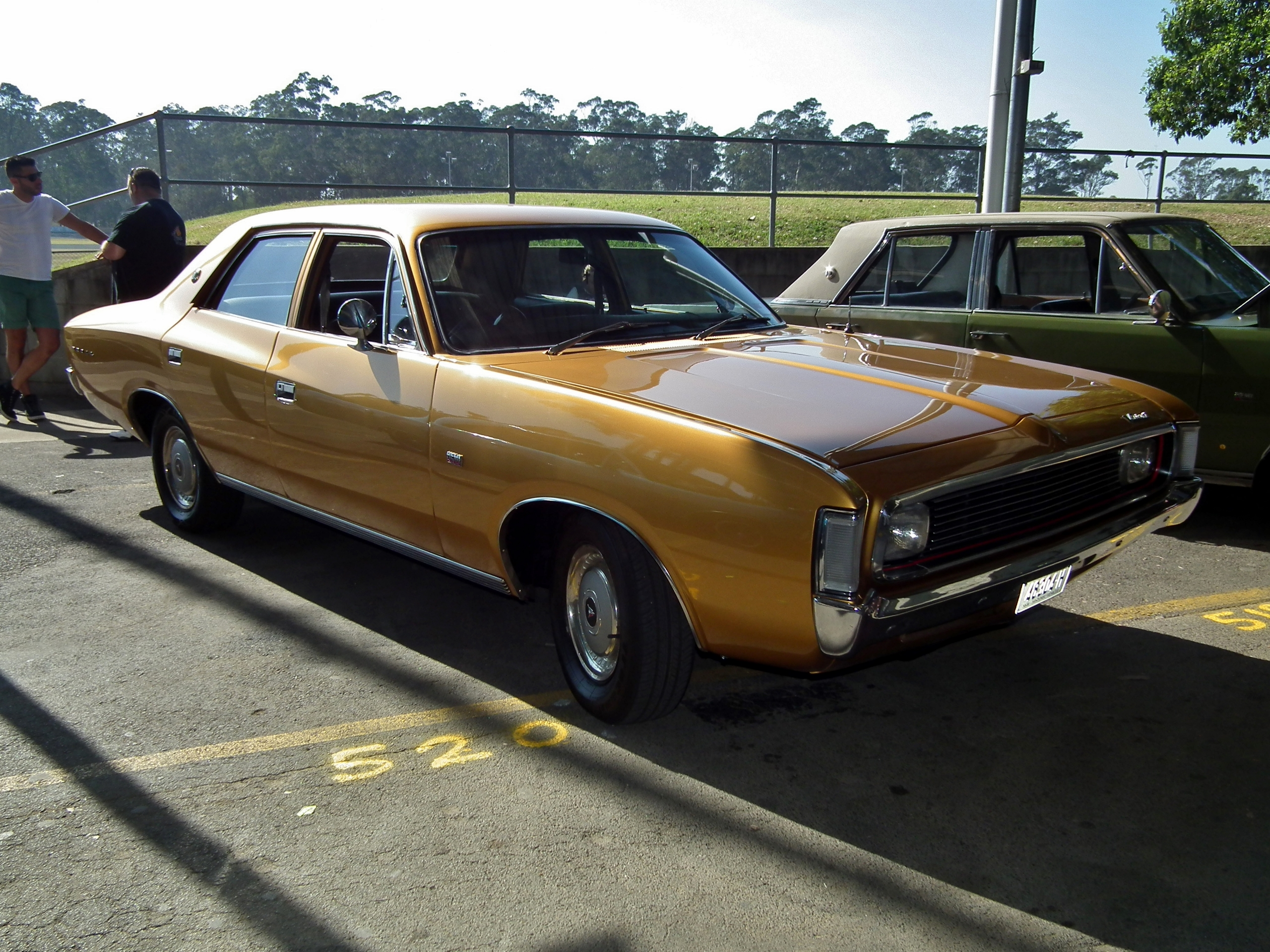
Chrysler VH Valiant Regal sedan

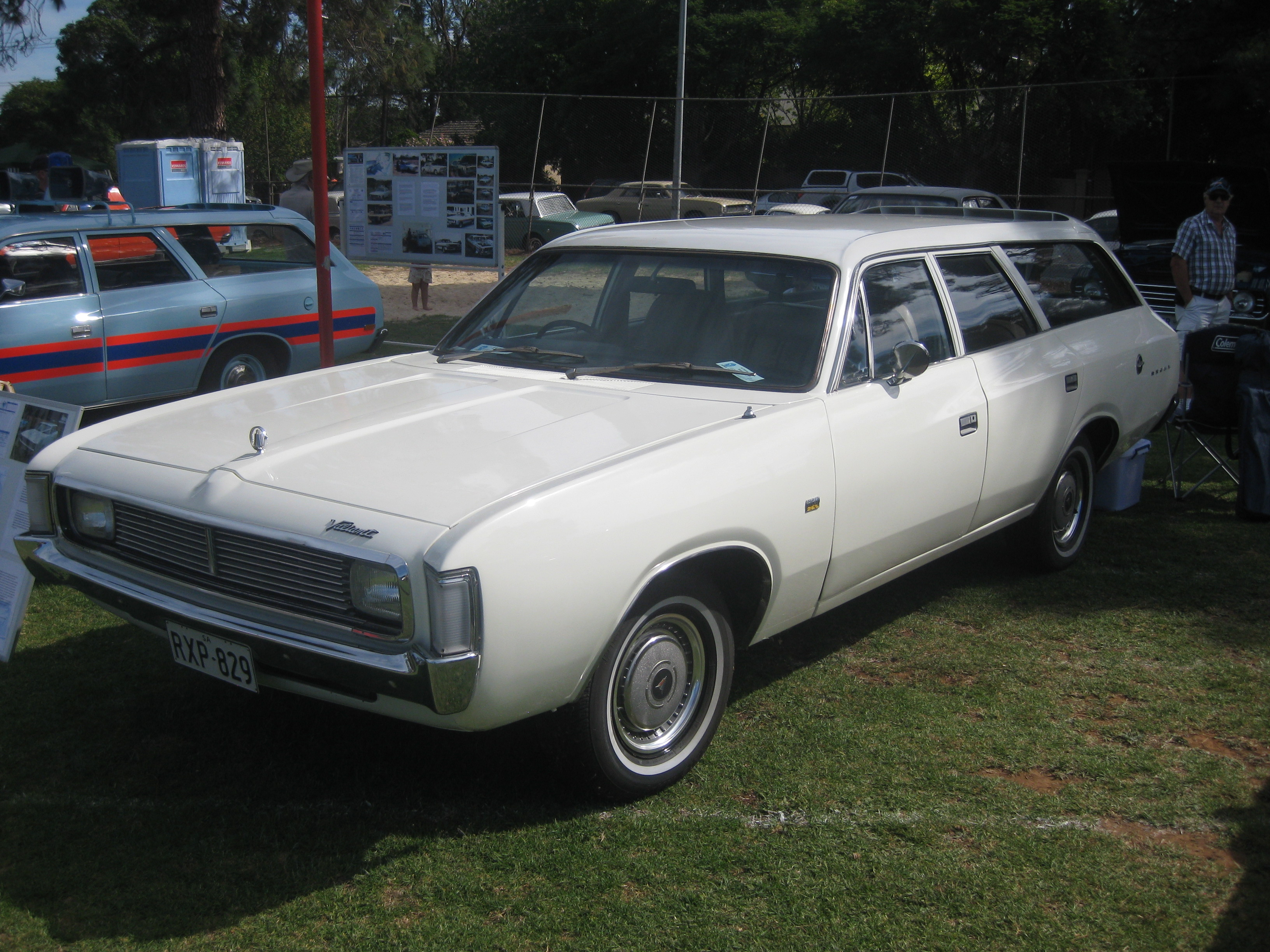
Chrysler VH Valiant Regal station wagon

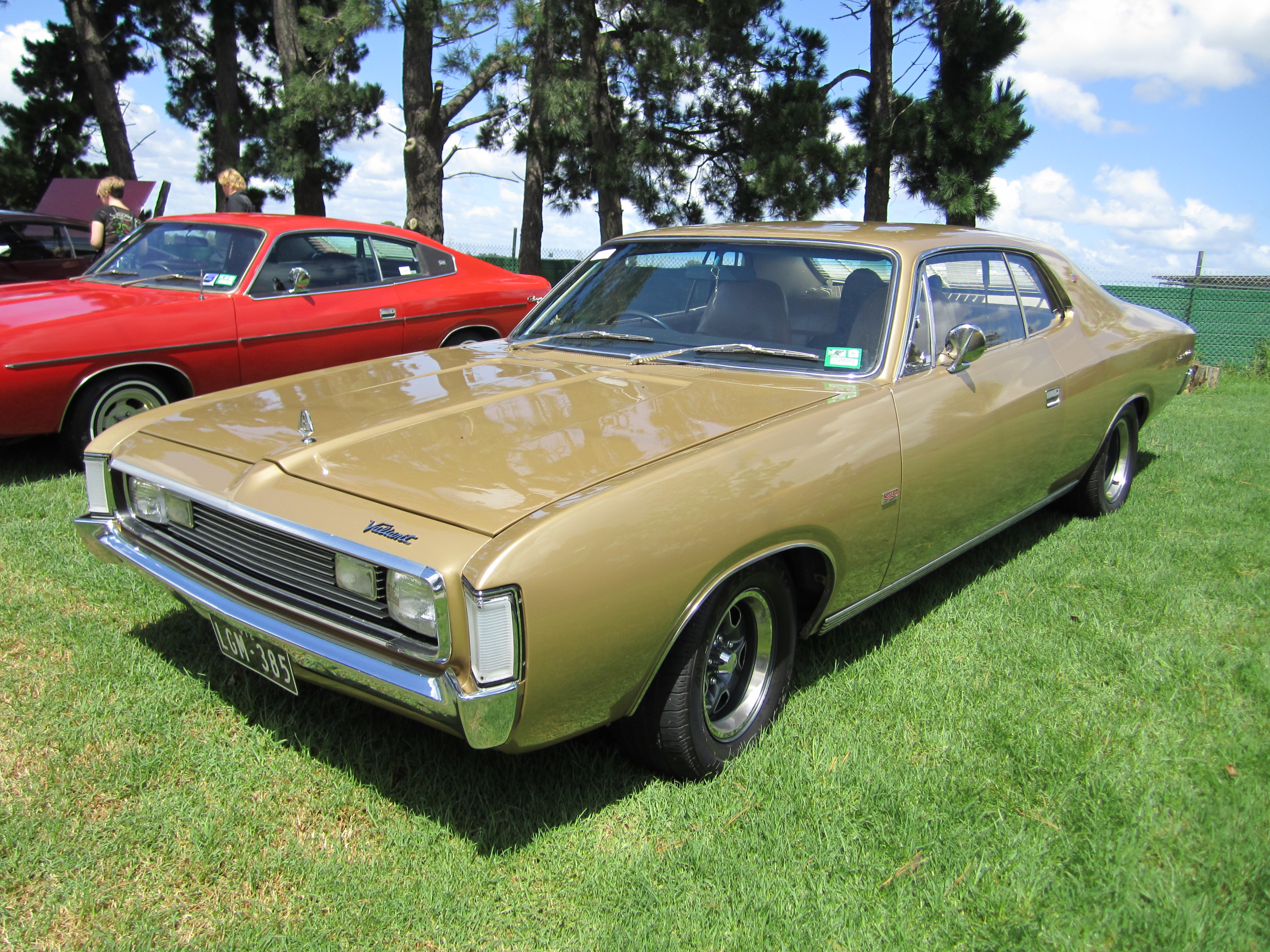
Chrysler Valiant VH Regal Hardtop

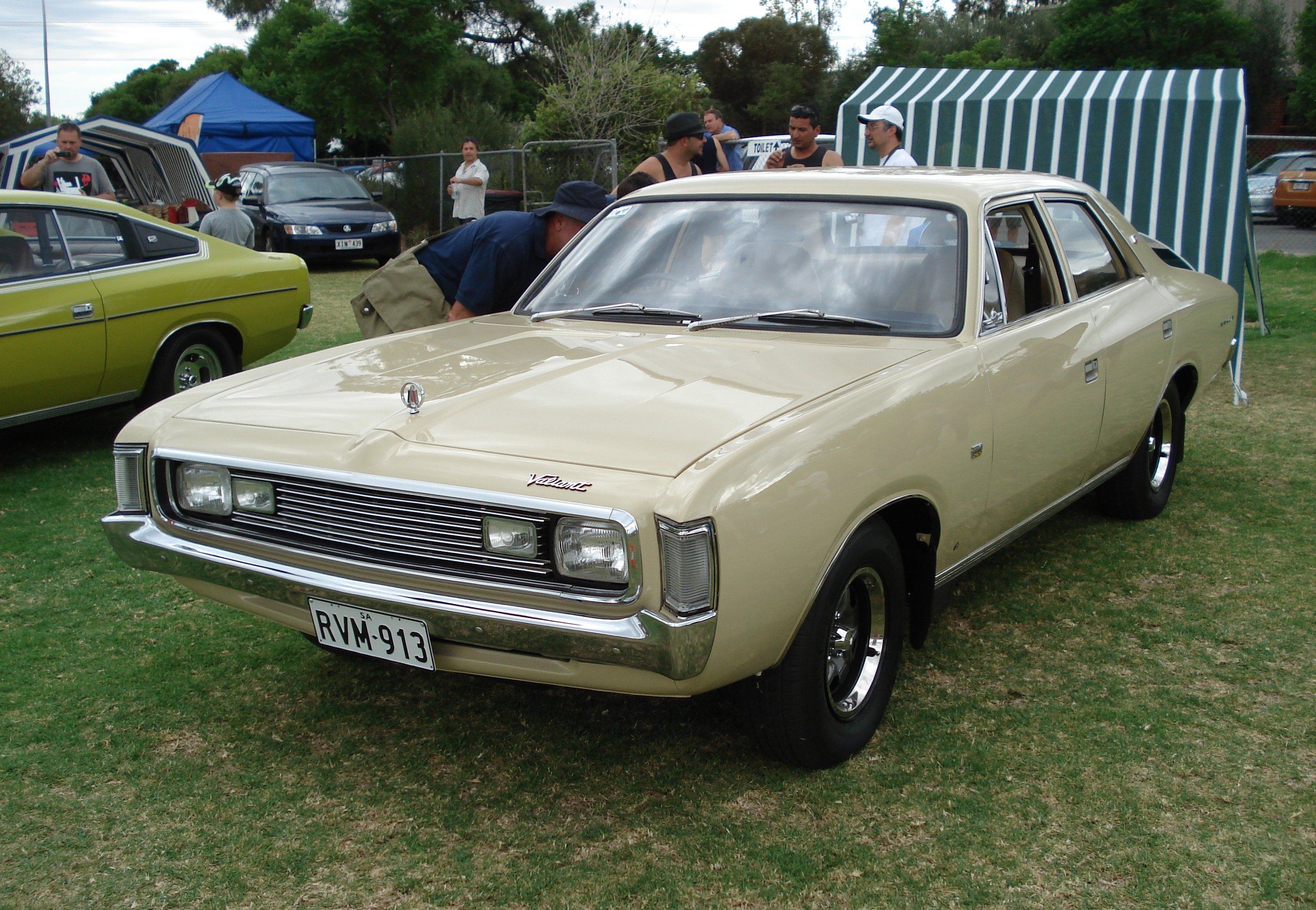
Chrysler VH Valiant Regal 770 sedan

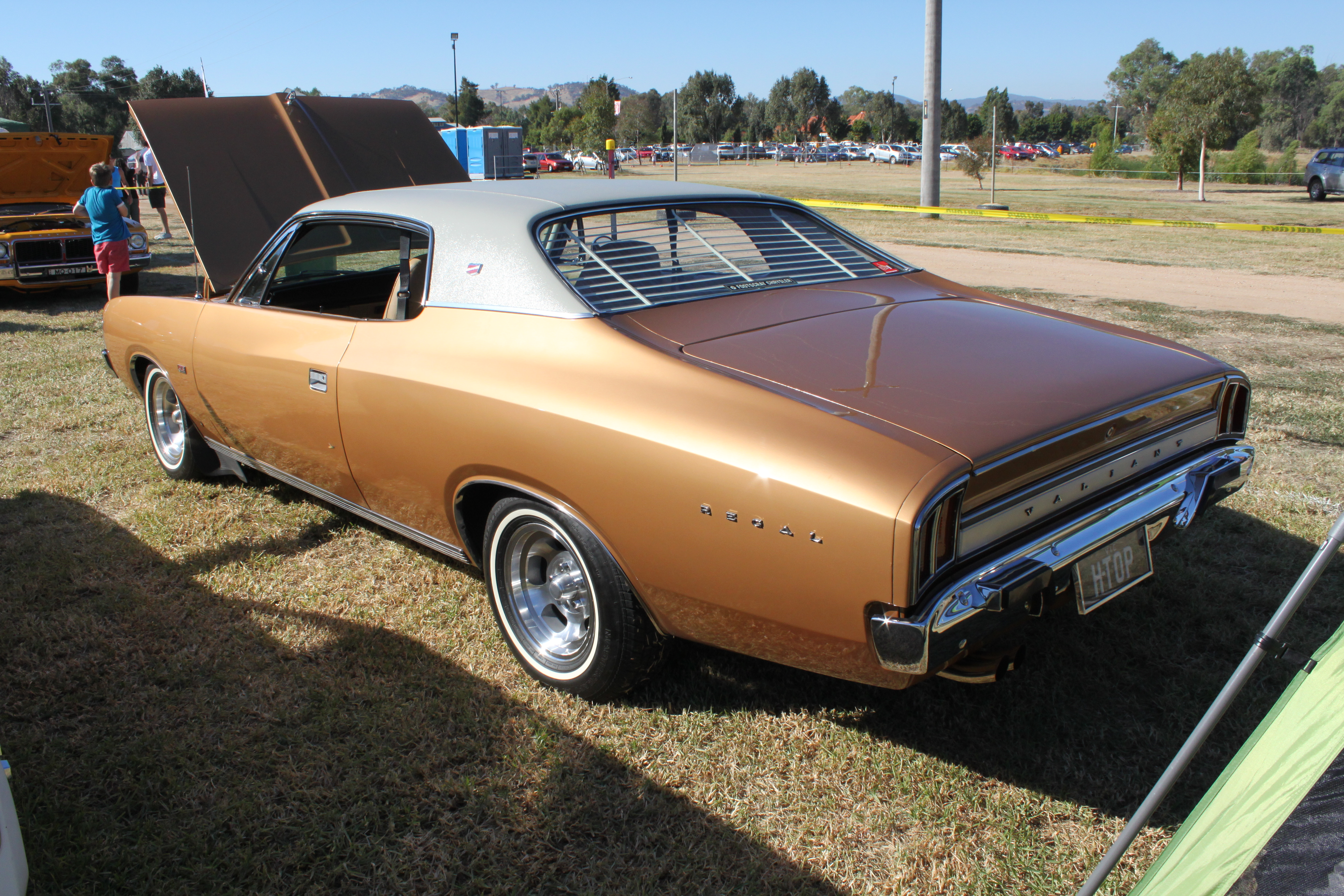
Chrysler Valiant VH Regal 770 Hardtop (16899312266)

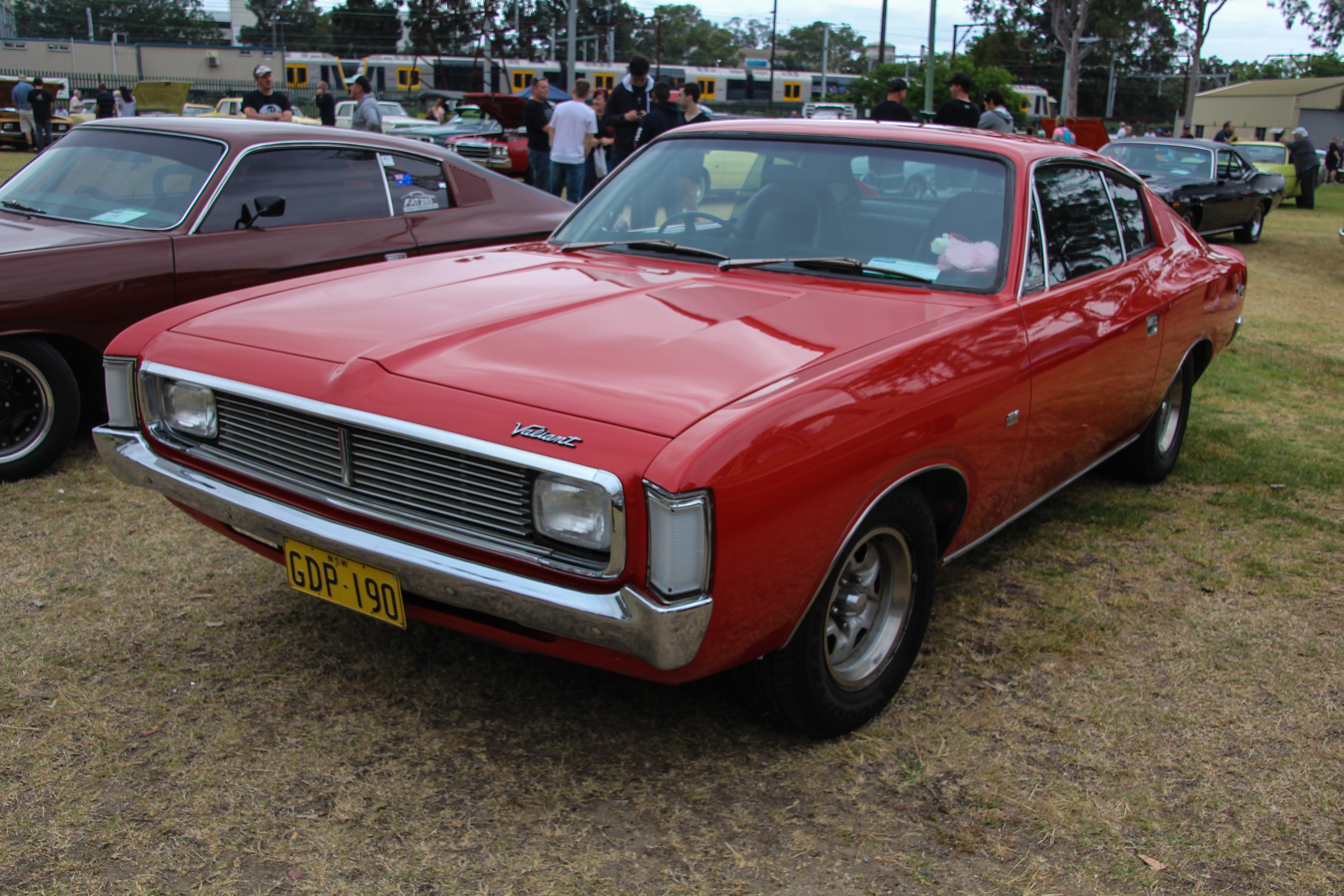
Chrysler VH Valiant Charger XL coupe

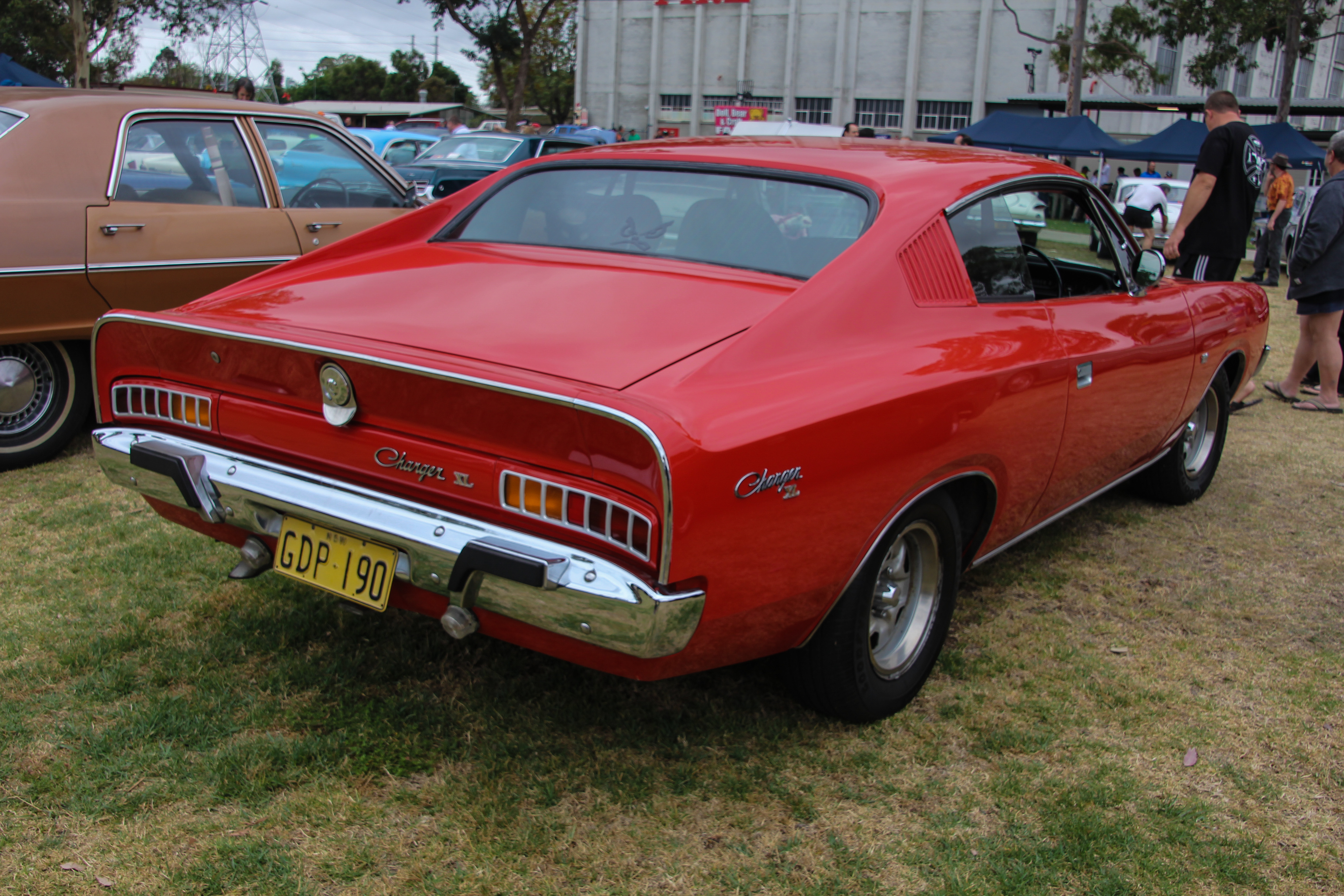
Chrysler VH Valiant Charger XL coupe (non standard backup lights below bumper)

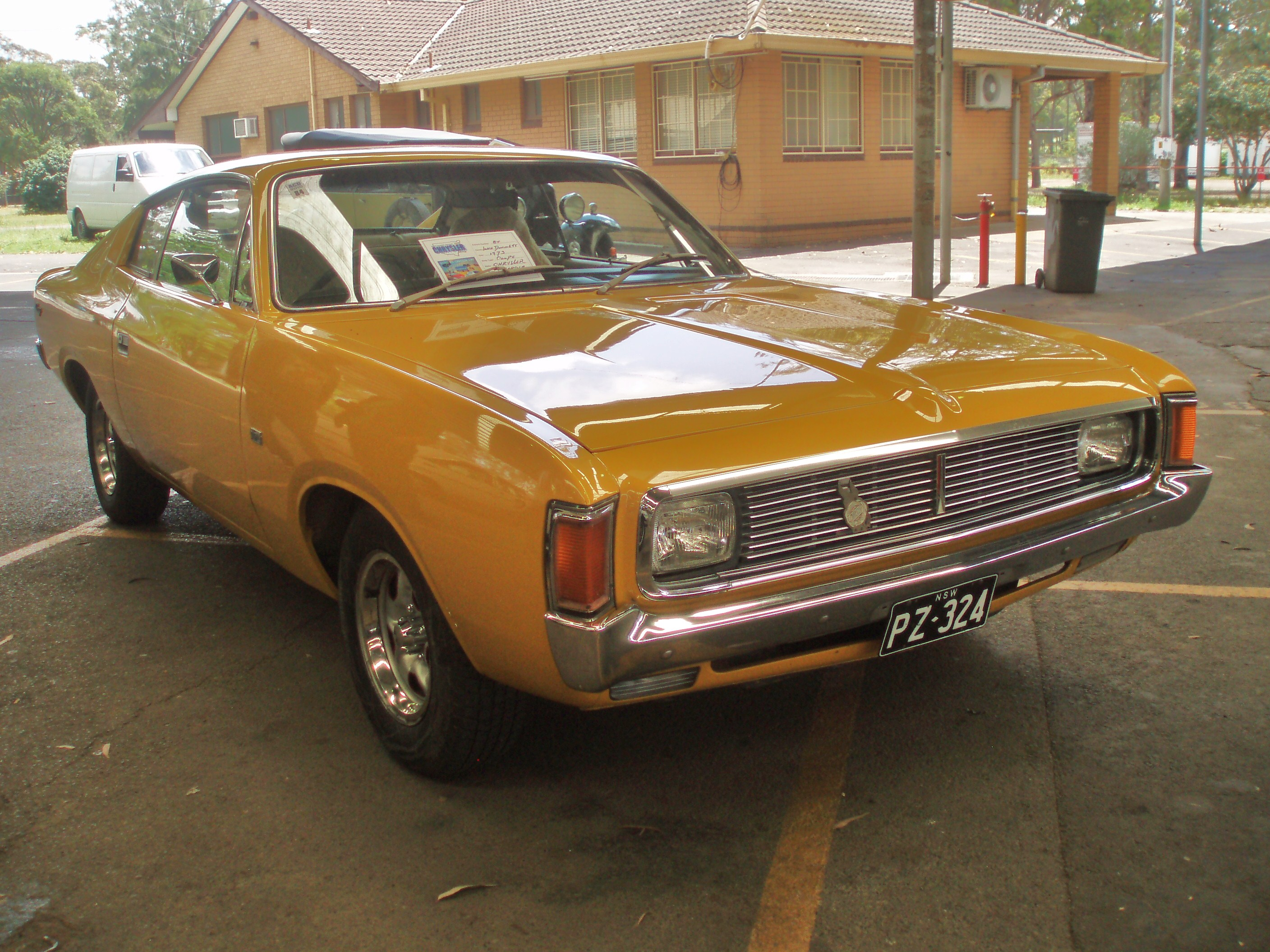
Chrysler VH Valiant Charger XL coupe. Note amber turn signals with park lights below bumper as required by Australian regulations for 1973

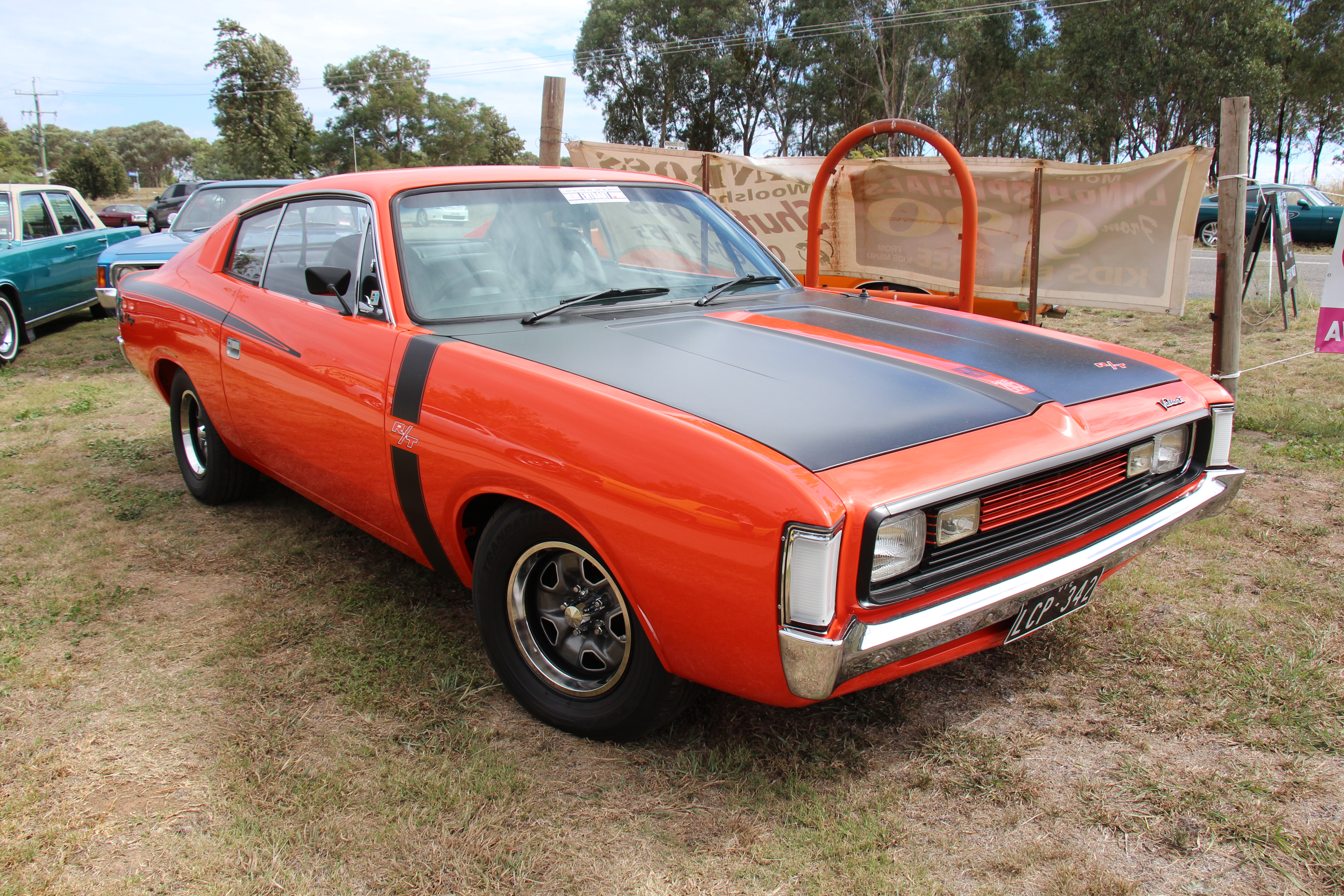
Chrysler Valiant VH Charger R/T E38

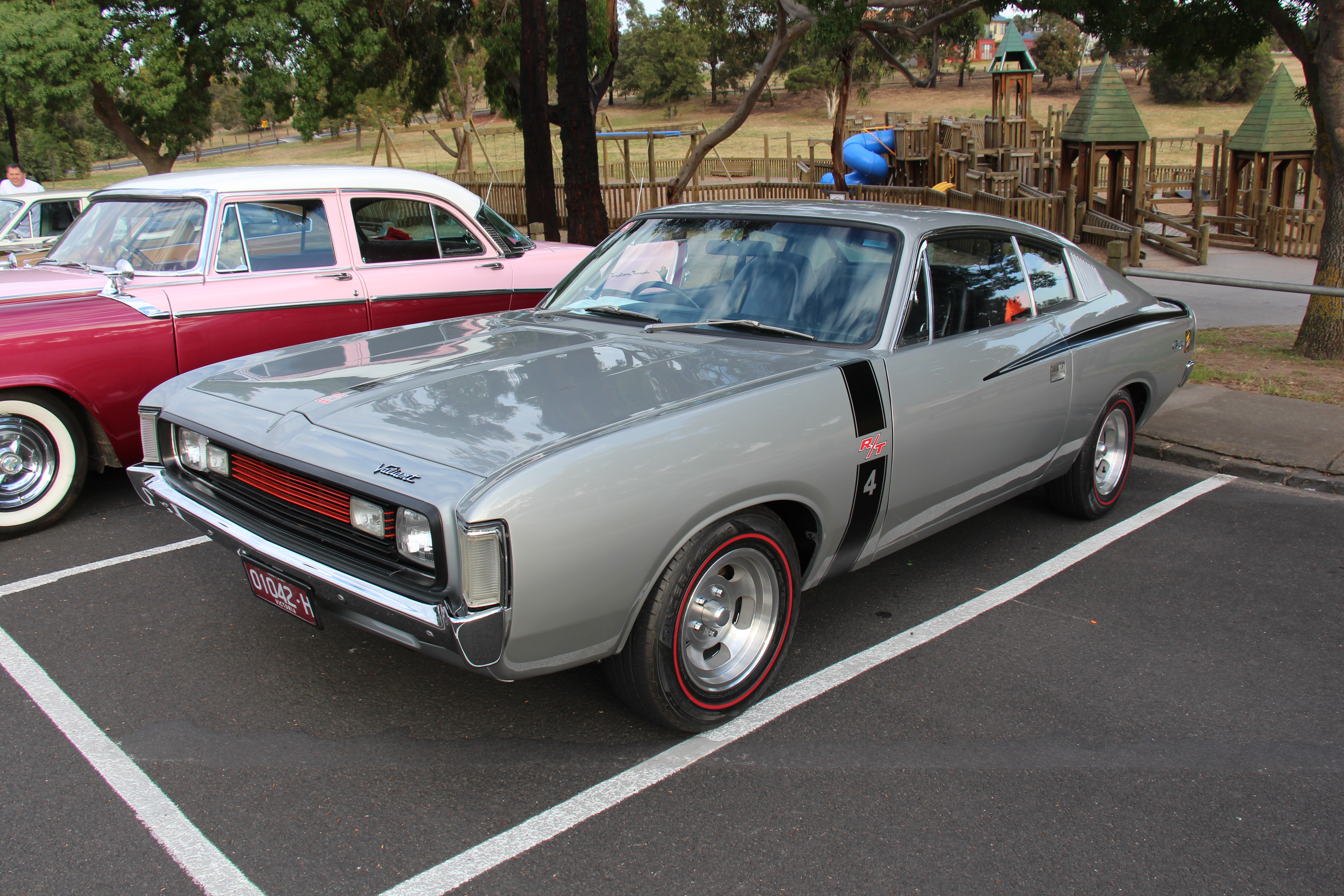
Chrysler Valiant VH Charger R/T E49

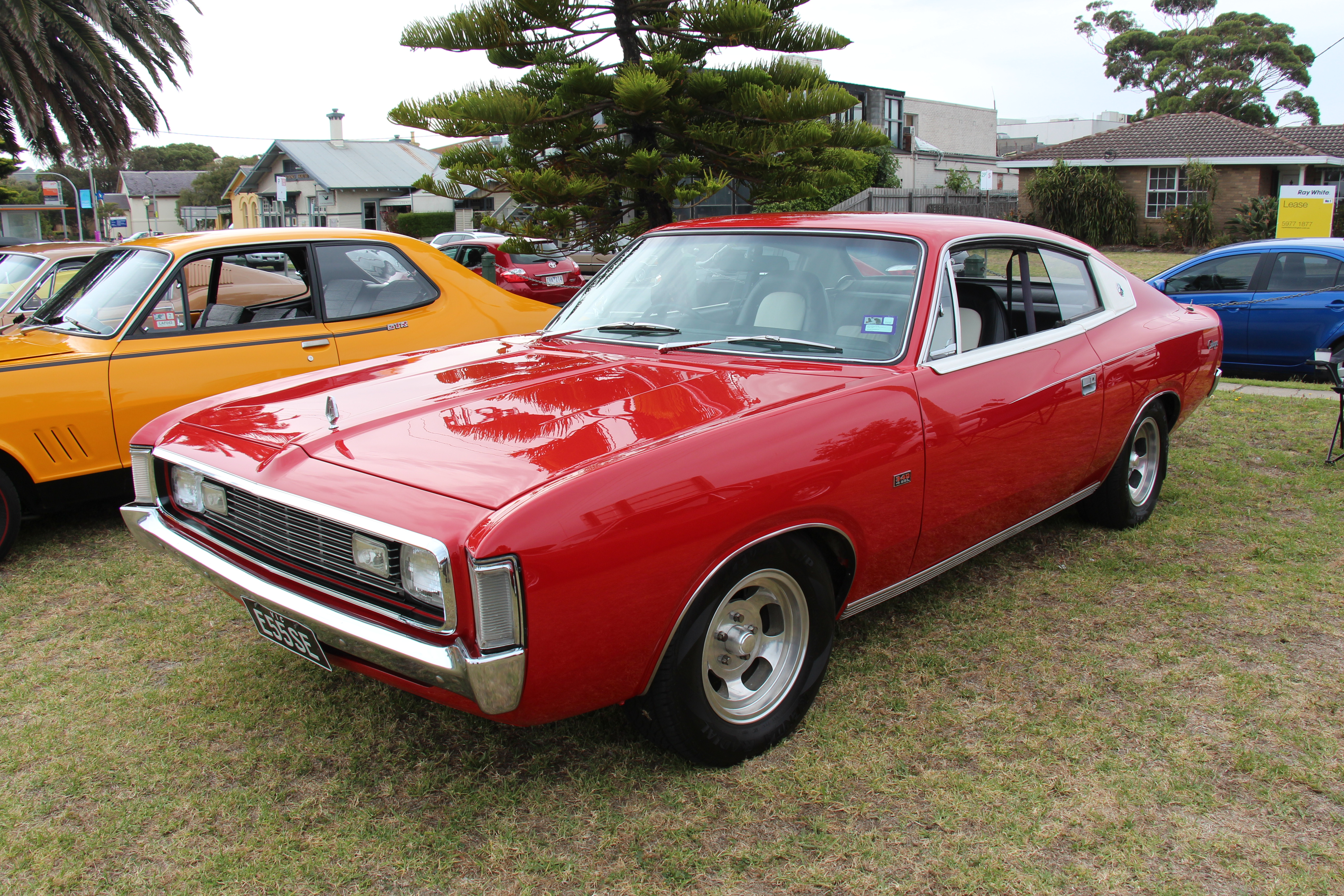
Chrysler Valiant VH Charger 770 SE E55

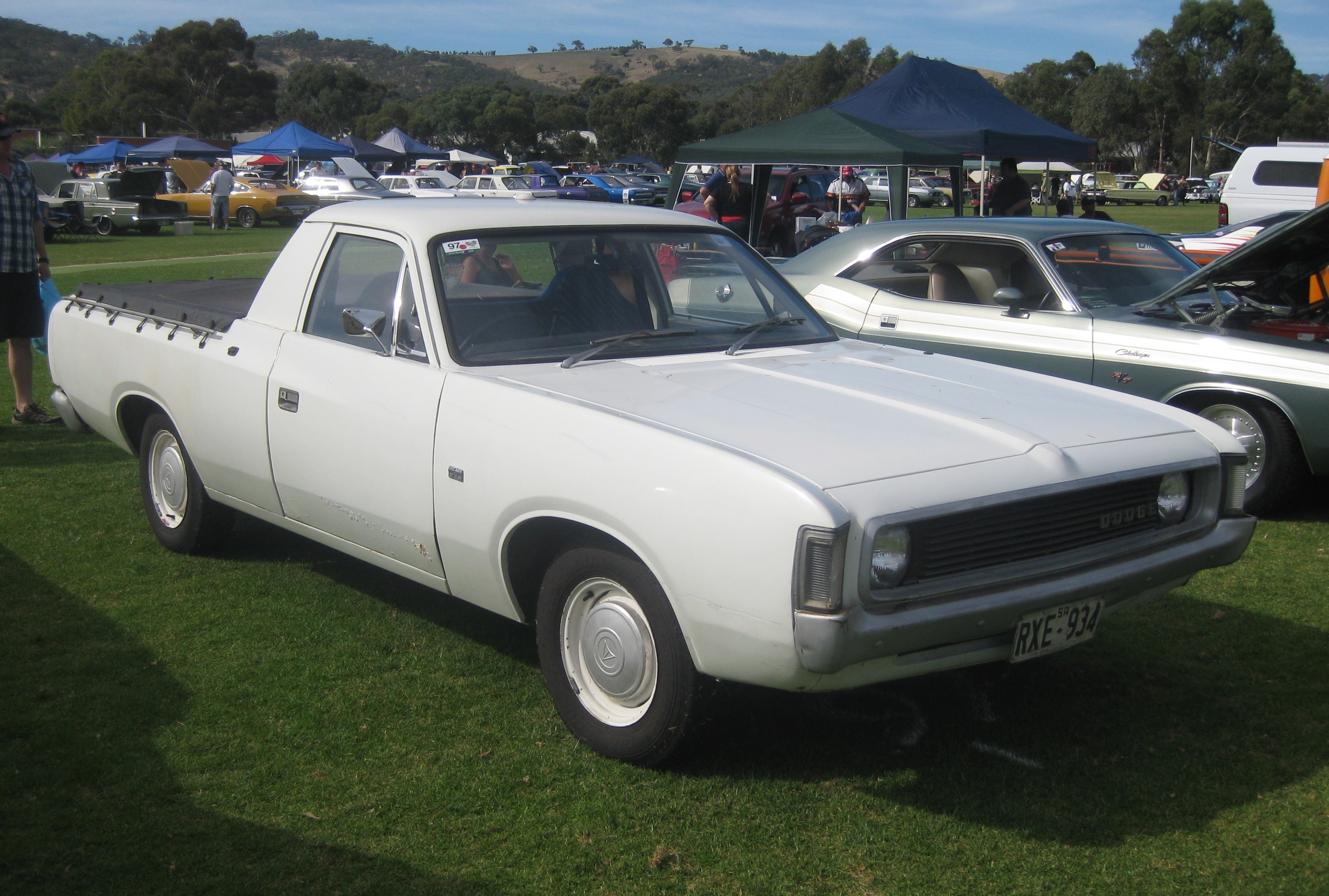
Dodge VH utility

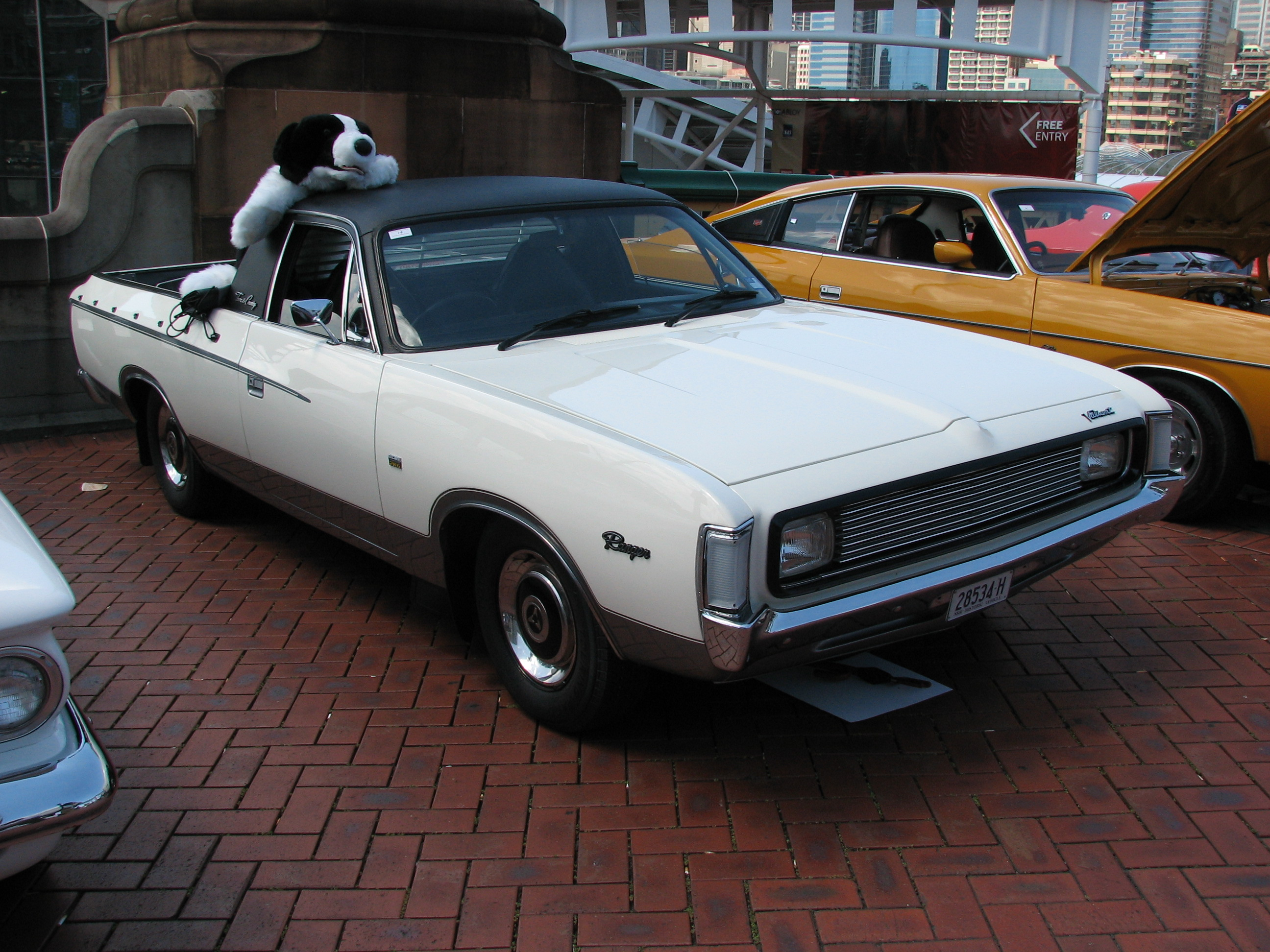
Chrysler VH Valiant Ranger Utility with Town & Country Pack

== Changes ==
The VH Valiant featured an entirely new body which was larger and more roomy than that of its VG series predecessor. It was an entirely Australian design and did not share any styling cues from the Plymouth Valiant and Dodge Dart models that previous Australian Valiant models were derived from. The new Valiant wheelbase was 111 inches and four inches wider, bringing the width to 74.2 inches.

The VH Hardtop models used body panels that were made entirely in Australia, unlike the previous VG Hardtops which had used imported sheet metal for all panels rear of the windscreen. The hardtops now rode on a 115-inch wheelbase, 4 inches longer than that on sedans and wagons.

The Valiant Charger, which made its debut as part of the VH series used a 105-inch wheelbase.

From 1973 Australian regulations required amber turn signals be fitted to the front of all passenger vehicles, as well as the rear. This meant the combined front park light/turn signals with clear lenses fitted to the VH were no longer legal. As a result 1973 build VH series cars were fitted with amber turn signals in place of the clear lenses, and park light were relocated to the panel below the front bumper.

The styling of the new model was not well received by the Australian public at large. Chrysler Australia sold 53,411 VH Valiants between June 1971 to May 1973 which was almost 20,000 units less than the 1967 VE Valiant. The VH’s sales were so low that in 1973 Chrysler Australia’s market share had slumped to 9.5 per cent and the company went from third position to fourth - behind Holden, Ford, and Toyota.

== Engines and transmissions ==
Chrysler Australia's “Hemi 6” straight six engine was offered in three displacements, 215 cid (3.5 litre), 245 cid (4.0 litre) and 265 cid (4.3 litre). and a 318 cid V8 was also available. A 340 cid V8 was fitted to the Charger 770SE E55 model which was released in October 1972. 3 speed manual and 3 speed automatic transmissions were offered initially with a 4 speed manual available on Charger models from June 1972.

== New Zealand production ==
Local importer Todd Motors assembled a VH sedan and Charger line using around 40% local content and unique specifications. The column shift manual or automatic front bench seat Ranger XL had exterior trim the same as the Australian base Ranger (no door frame or wheel arch brightwork, no tail lamp embellishment), unique local seat design and upholstery and a two barrel version of the 245 Hemi engine. The Regal 770 had separate front seats, 265 Hemi with floor console shift automatic or 318V8 and a standard delete option vinyl roof. The Charger was assembled only as a 770 with the console automatic and lacked the Australian version's reclining front seats and rear overriders. Early production had one piece front door glass and opening rear side windows; due to sealing problems, this was changed to front quarterlights (an Australian factory option) and fixed rear side glass.

== South African production ==
VH Valiants were assembled at Silverton, near Pretoria in South Africa using Australian bodies, electrics and trim and locally sourced mechanical components including a 225 cid engine. (Prior to 1971 South African Valiants were right-hand-drive Plymouth Valiants imported from Canada.) Local versions were sold as the Chrysler Valiant Rebel, Rebel 660, Regal, Charger Coupé, and Chrysler VIP. Station wagons were also available of the Rebel and Regal. For 1973 the Dodge SE (for "Special Edition") appeared, a luxury version with different front and rear treatment, vinyl roof, full equipment and a 142 kW (193 PS; 190 hp) version of the slant-six engine. Aside from the six-cylinder engine, the Dodge SE was very similar to the Australian-market Chrysler by Chrysler.

== Production and replacement ==
A total of 67,800 VH Valiants were built prior to its replacement by the VJ Valiant range in 1973.

== Chrysler by Chrysler ==
In November 1971, Chrysler Australia introduced the CH series Chrysler by Chrysler, which was a long wheelbase, luxury model developed from the VH Valiant. It was offered in four-door sedan and two-door hardtop bodystyles with a choice of 265 cid six and 360 cid V8 engines.

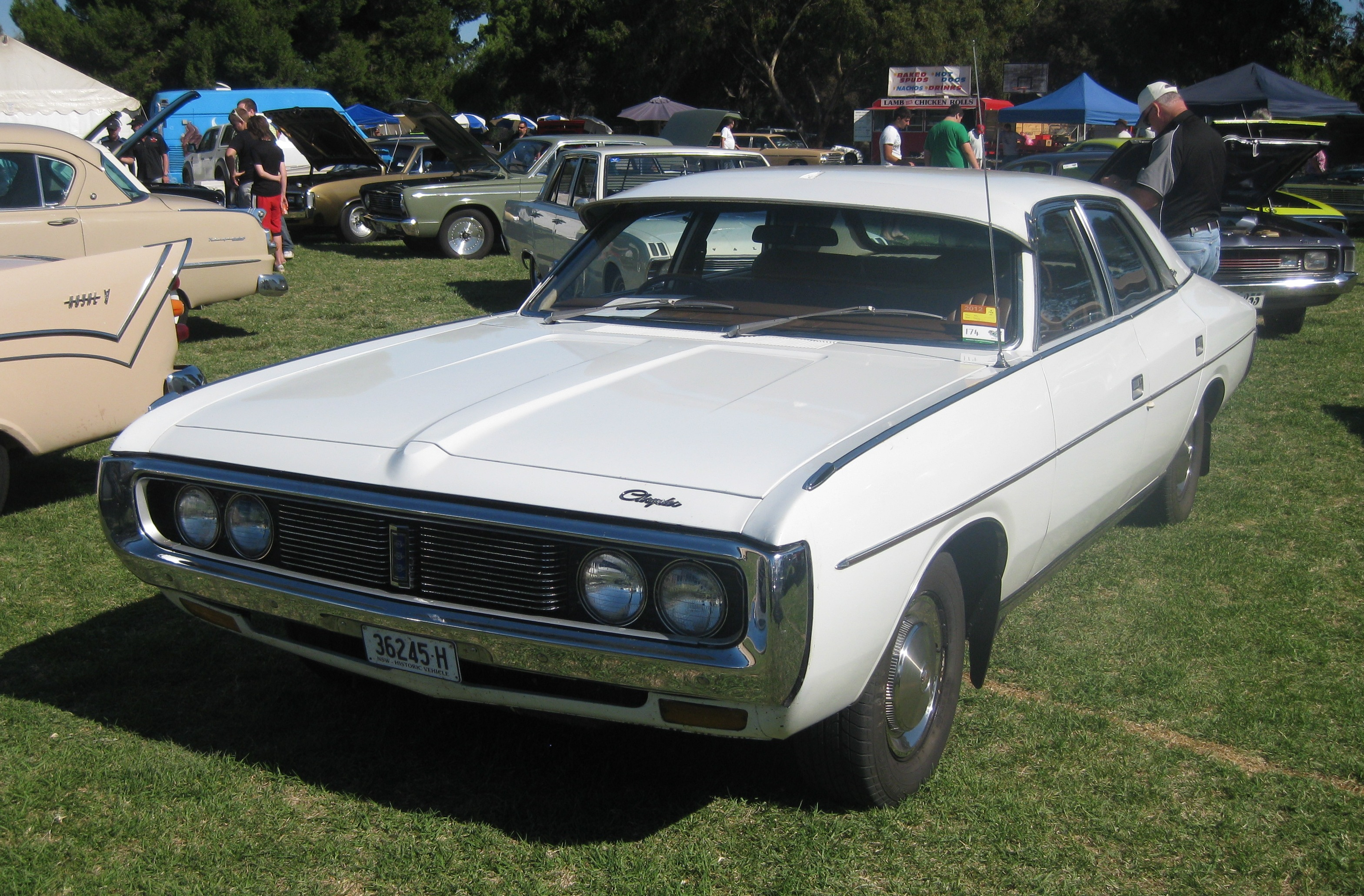
Chrysler by Chrysler sedan (CH series)

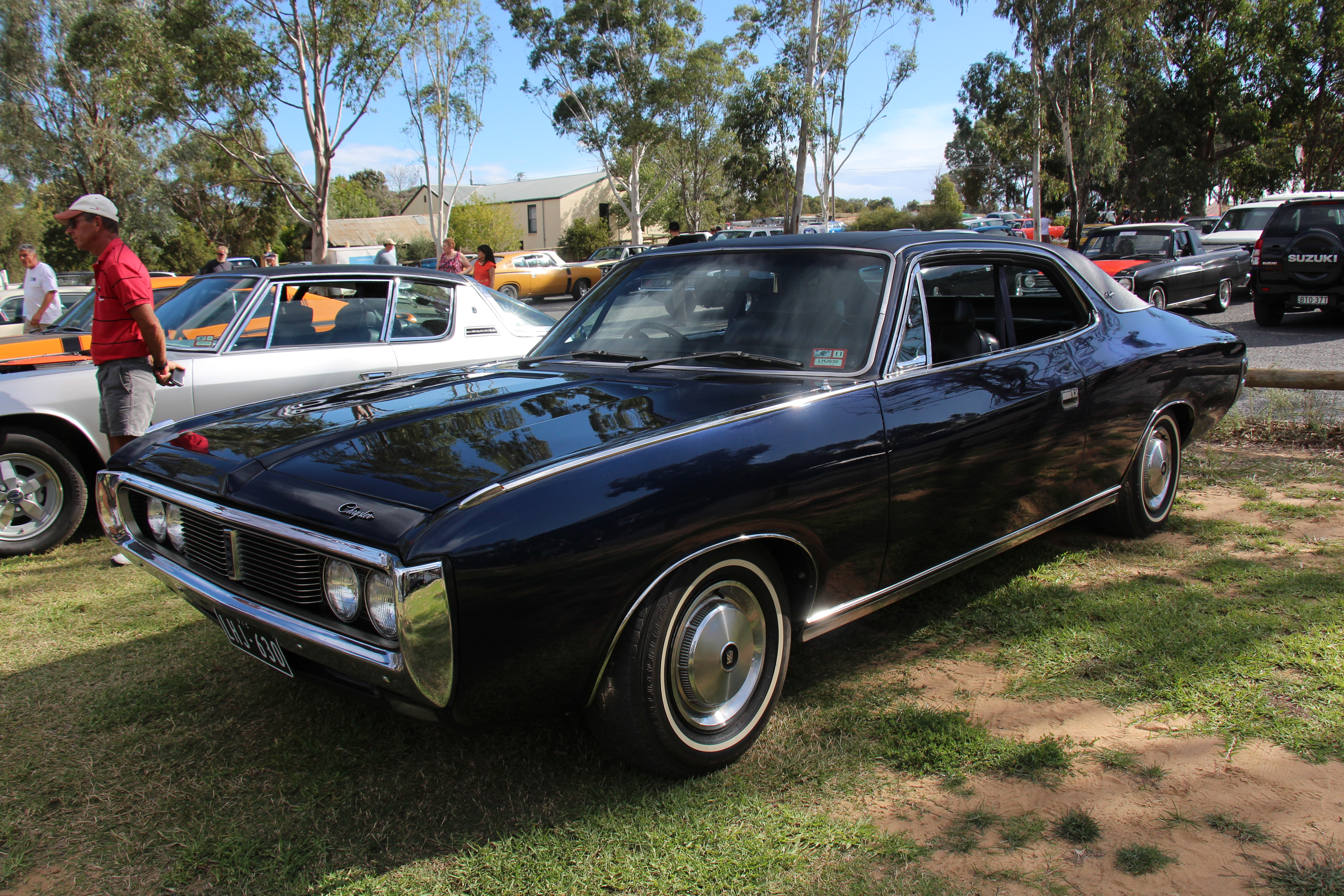
Chrysler by Chrysler CH Hardtop
