= Chrysler by Chrysler =

Australian full-size luxury car

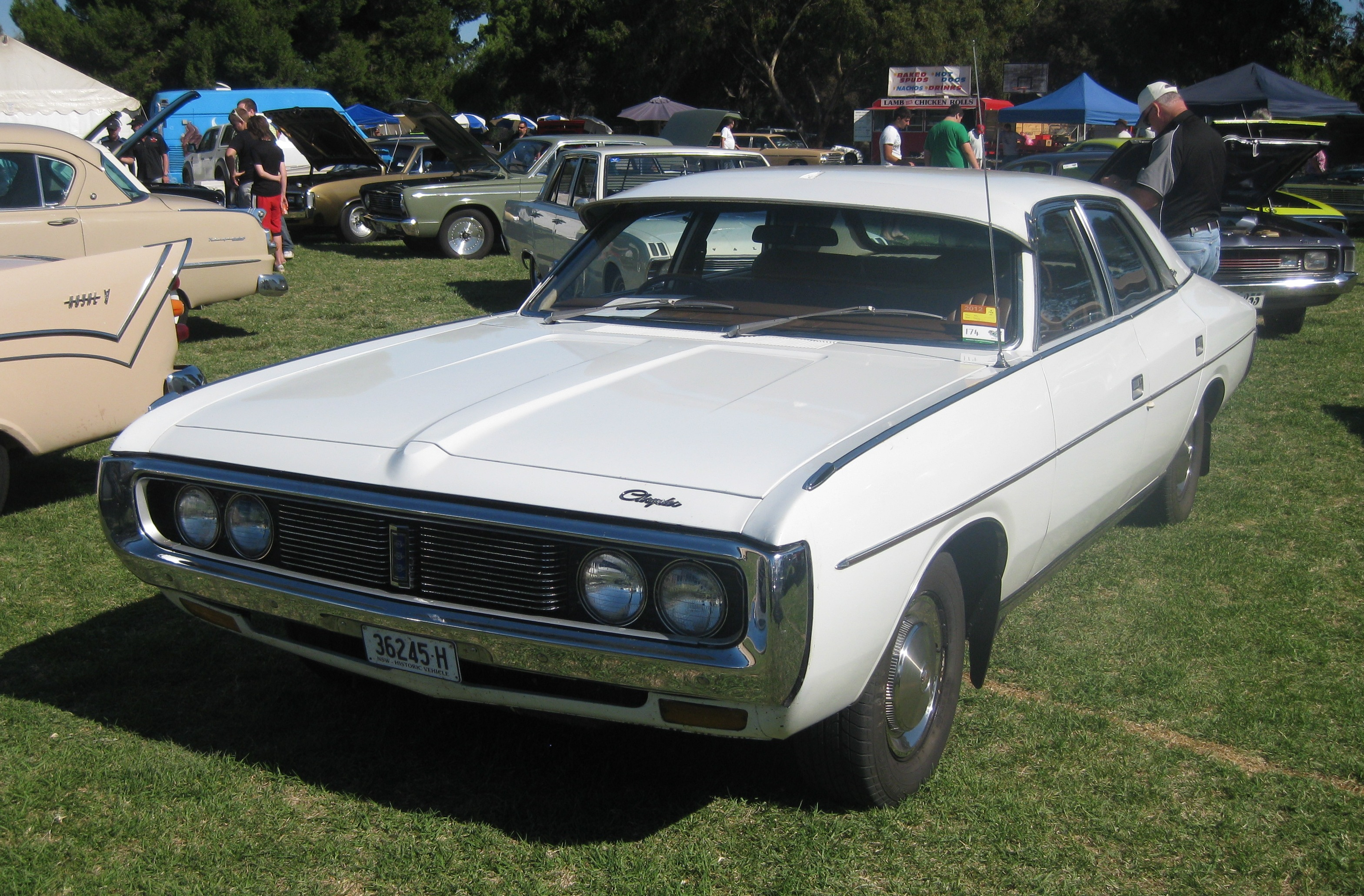
- Chrysler by Chrysler CH Sedan

Overview
- Manufacturer: Chrysler Australia
- Also called: The Chrysler; Dodge SE (South Africa)
- Production: November 1971 – October 1976
- Assembly: Australia: Tonsley Park; South Africa: Pretoria

Body and chassis
- Class: Full-size
- Body style: 4-door sedan 2-door hardtop
- Layout: FR layout
- Related: Chrysler Valiant

Powertrain
- Engine: 265 cu in (4.3 L) Chrysler Hemi Straight-6 Engine; 318 cu in (5.2 L) LA V8; 360 cu in (5.9 L) V8
- Transmission: 3-speed automatic

Dimensions
- Wheelbase: 115.0 in (2,921 mm)
- Length: 196.7 in (4,996 mm)
- Width: 74.2 in (1,885 mm)
- Height: Sedan: 56.2 in (1,427 mm); Hardtop: 55.2 in (1,402 mm)
- Kerb weight: Sedan (V8): 3,570 lb (1,620 kg)

Chronology
- Predecessor: Chrysler VG VIP
- Successor: Chrysler CL Regal SE

The Chrysler by Chrysler is an automobile produced by Chrysler Australia from 1971 to 1976. It is an extended wheelbase, luxury variant of the Australian developed Chrysler Valiant.

== CH Series (1971–1973) ==
The original CH Series Chrysler was introduced in November 1971 replacing the Chrysler VIP as Chrysler’s competitor to the Ford Fairlane and the Statesman in the Australian prestige car market. It was offered in four-door Sedan and two-door Hardtop models. The Chrysler was based on the VH series Chrysler Valiant, utilizing the floorpan of the two-door Hardtop version. The 115 in (2,900 mm) wheelbase of the Chrysler was identical to that of the Valiant Hardtop and 4 in (100 mm) longer than that used on the Valiant Sedan. The Chrysler also differed significantly from the Valiant in external appearance, featuring a four headlight grille encircled by a chrome surround and a unique wrap-around horizontal tail-light assembly. The frontal styling and wrap-around bumper were similar to the 1969-1971 Chrysler New Yorker. A long list of standard luxury equipment items set the Chrysler further apart from the Valiant and included front disc brakes, power assisted steering, a push button radio with power antenna, a carpeted boot, tinted power operated windows and courtesy lighting which included adjustable reading lights for rear passengers. Considerable attention had also been taken to reduce noise, vibration, and harshness (NVH) with the application of additional soundproofing material.

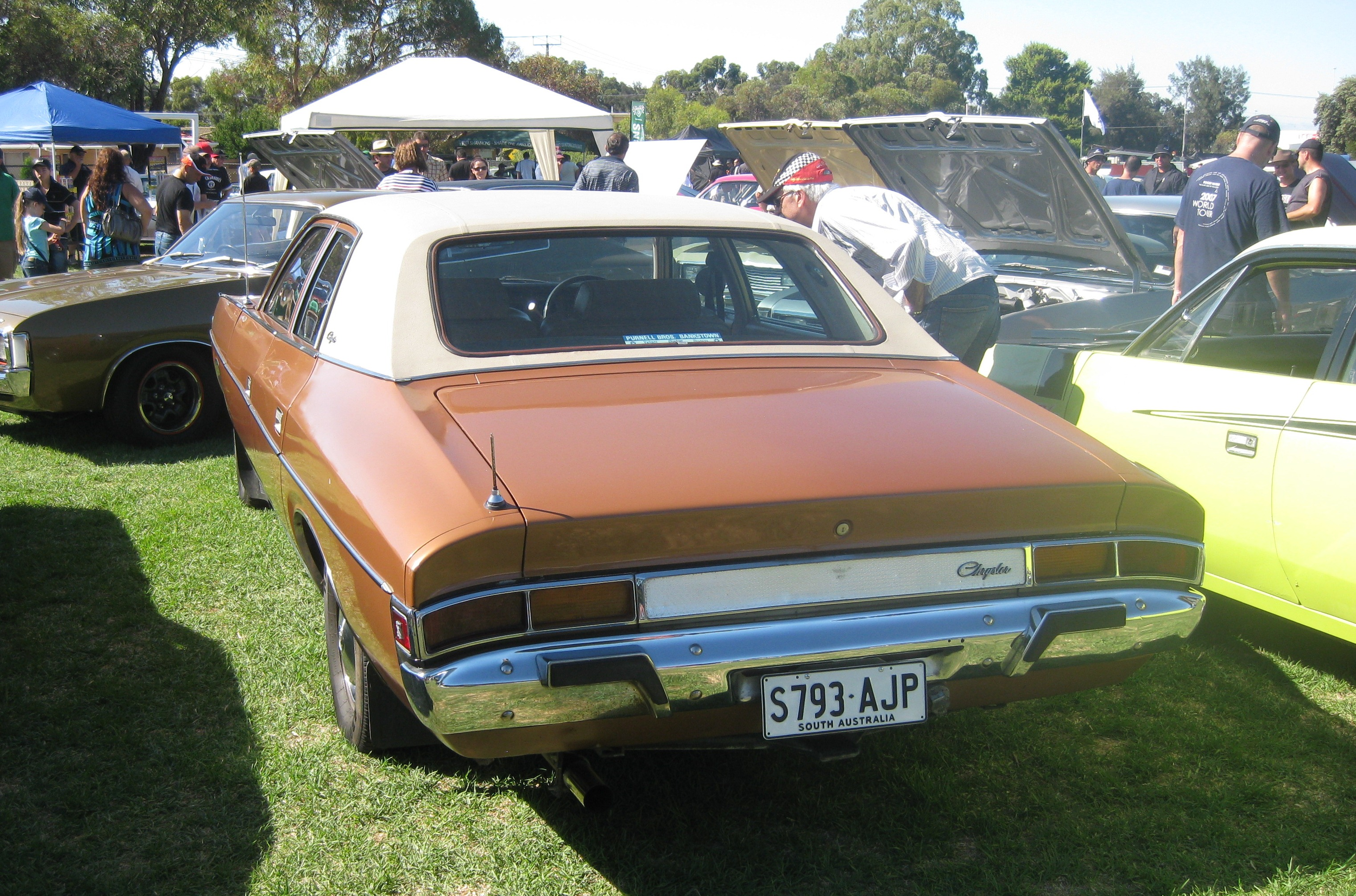
Chrysler by Chrysler CH Sedan

A 265 cu in (4.3 L) Hemi six-cylinder engine was fitted as standard equipment, with an American designed, Australian built 360 cu in (5.9 L) V8 available as an option. An imported “TorqueFlite” three-speed automatic transmission was used in all variants.

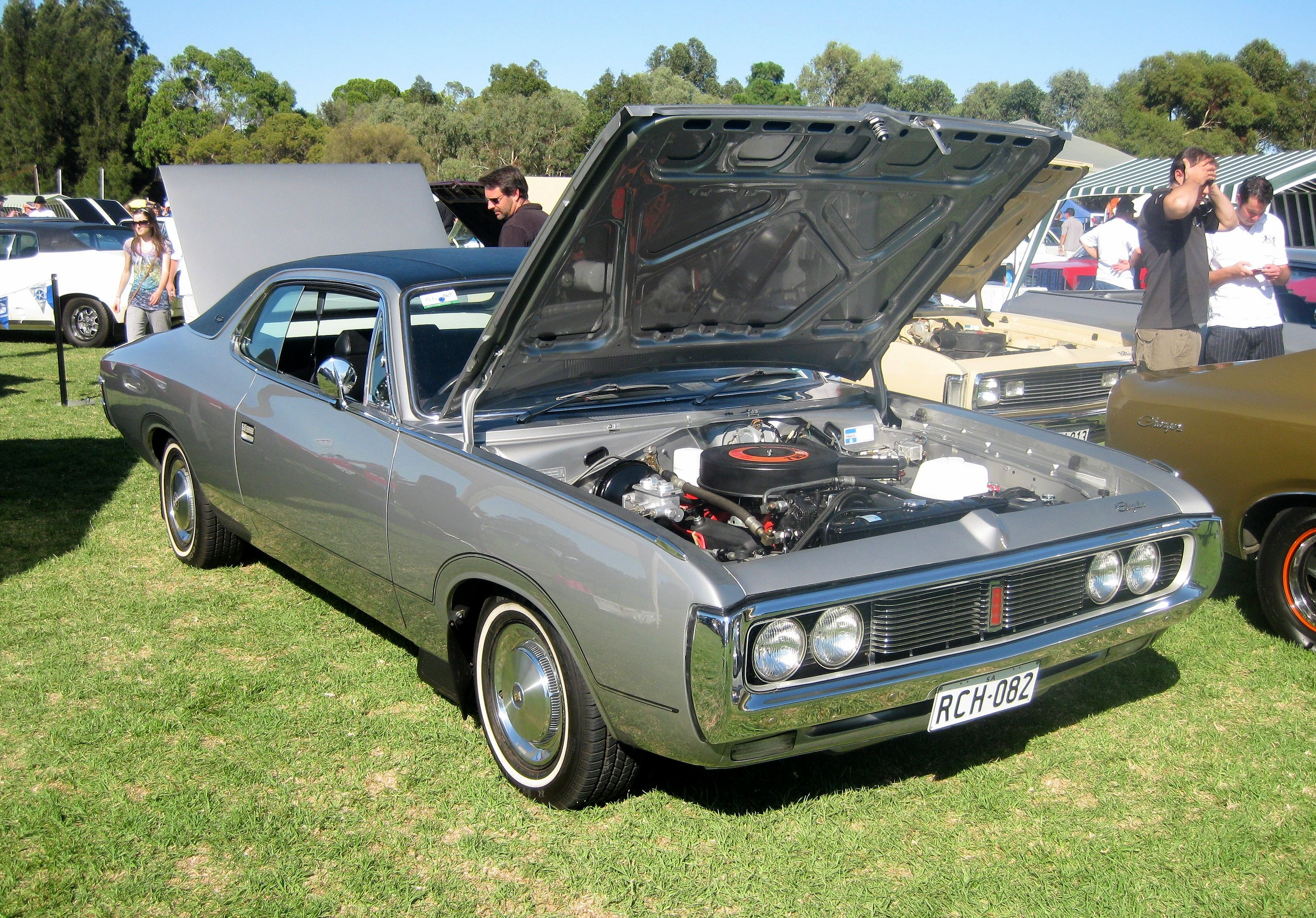
Chrysler by Chrysler CH Hardtop

== CJ Series (1973–1975) ==
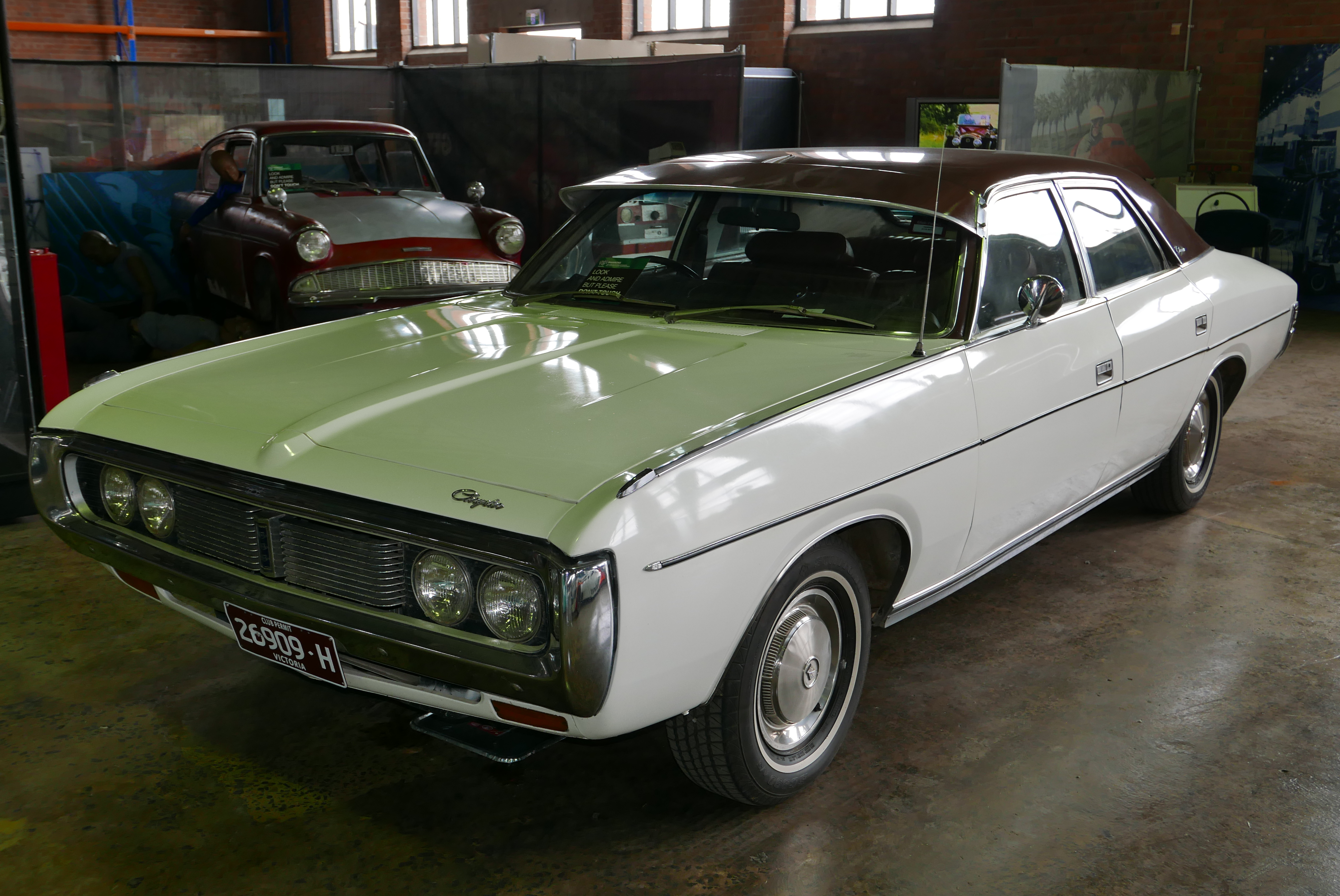
Chrysler by Chrysler (CJ)

An updated CJ Series version of the Chrysler was released in May 1973, one month after the VJ Series update of the Valiant. This model of the Chrysler was distinguishable by minor cosmetic styling changes from its predecessor. The four-door Sedan was now the only model offered, as the two-door Hardtop body-style was not carried over into this Series.

This model was also sold in some export markets, including Japan where it was marketed as the "Chrysler 318 CA" and featured a three-speed automatic transmission coupled to the smaller 5.2 liter V8 which was not offered in Australian market cars until 1976, with 150 PS (148 hp; 110 kW). Claimed top speed for the Japanese market model is 170 km/h (106 mph).

== CK Series (1975–1976) ==
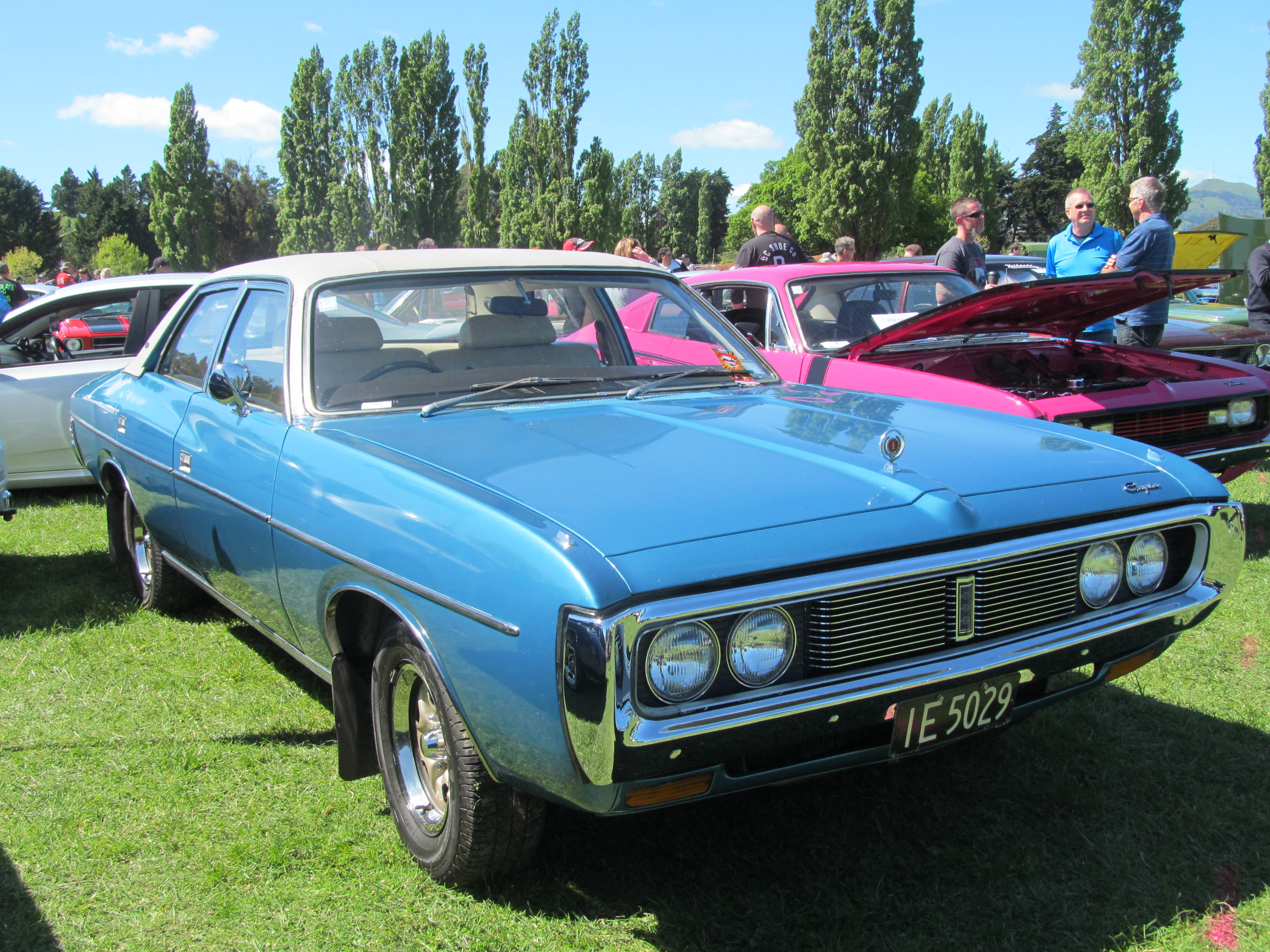
Chrysler by Chrysler (CK) (with non-standard wheels)

An updated CK Series version of the Chrysler was released in October 1975, coinciding with the release of the VK Valiant range. Changes were again minor. The 360 cu in (5.9 L) V8 engine was modified to improve both economy and performance, however new emission regulations saw this unit replaced by a 318 cu in (5.2 L) V8 from 1 July 1976.

The CK Chrysler was discontinued in October 1976 with the introduction of the CL Series of Valiant and Regal models. This range included a luxury Chrysler Regal SE Sedan which effectively replaced the Chrysler, although it did not feature the longer wheelbase or the unique styling features of the outgoing model.

== International markets ==
South Africa

The Chrysler by Chrysler four-door model was locally built and sold in South Africa as the "Dodge SE" along with other Australian Valiant models.

New Zealand

New Zealand also imported the Chrysler by Chrysler which was sold alongside other Australian Valiants which were otherwise locally assembled by Todd Motors in Wellington.

Japan

The VH Valiant Charger and CJ Chrysler by Chrysler were exported to Japan via Mitsubishi. These were not successful due to the winding narrow roads of Japan, and the spiralling fuel costs Japan was experiencing as one of the targeted nations during the 1973 oil crisis.

United Kingdom

Australian Valiants were exported to the United Kingdom from the late 1960s to 1976 including the Chrysler By Chrysler.

== See also ==
- Chrysler Australia
- Chrysler Valiant
