= Plymouth Valiant =

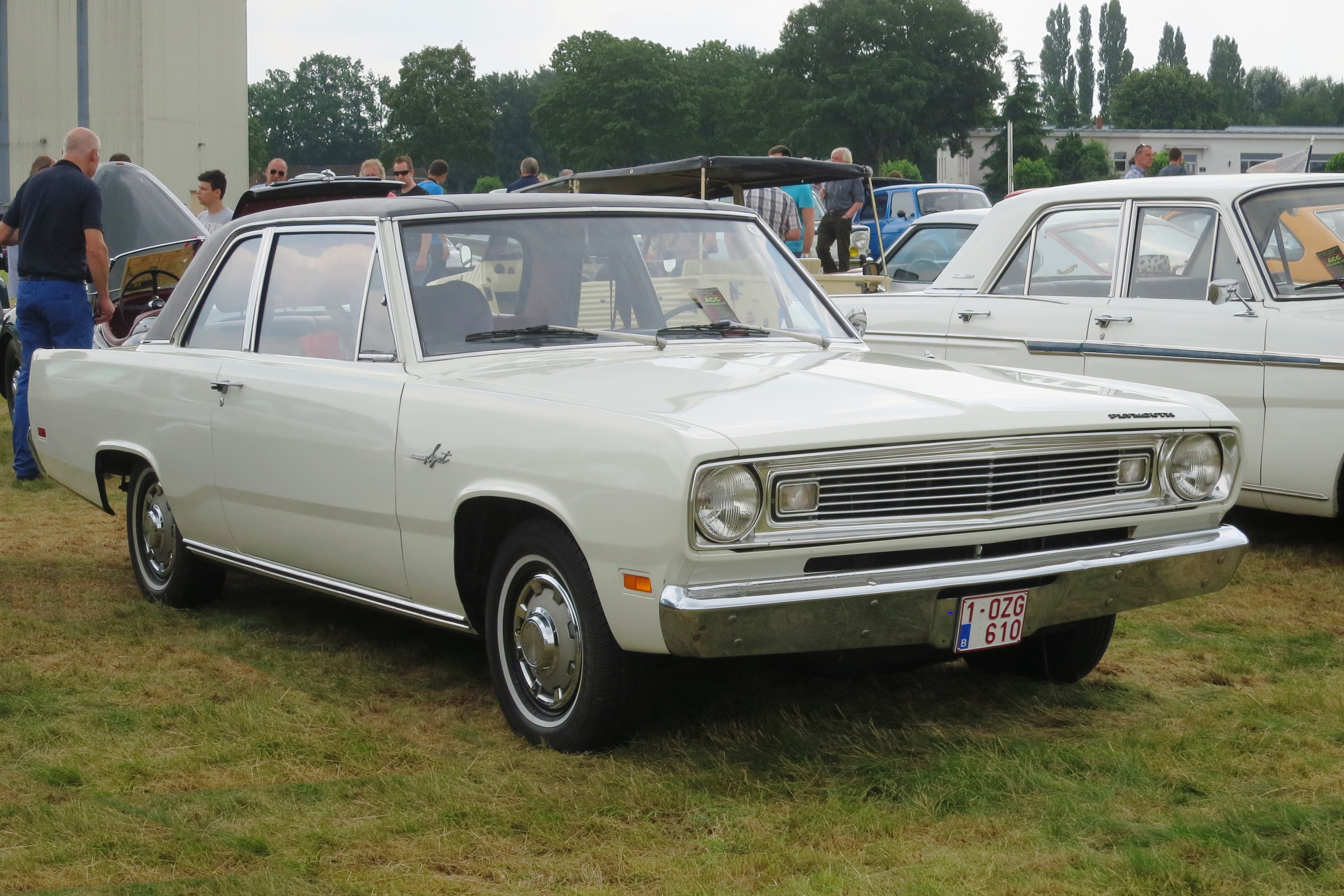
- 1969 Plymouth Valiant Signet 2-door sedan

Overview
- Manufacturer: Plymouth (Chrysler)
- Production: 1959–1976

Body and chassis
- Class: Compact
- Layout: FR layout
- Platform: A-body

Chronology
- Successor: Plymouth Volaré

The Plymouth Valiant (first appearing in 1959 as simply the Valiant) is an automobile which was marketed by the Plymouth division of the Chrysler Corporation in the United States from the model years of 1960 through 1976. It was created to give the company an entry in the compact car market emerging in the late 1950s and became well known for its excellent durability and reliability. It was one of Chrysler's best-selling automobiles during the 1960s and 1970s helping to keep the company solvent during an economic downturn. Road & Track magazine considered the Valiant to be "one of the best all-around domestic cars".

The Valiant was also built and marketed, with or without the Plymouth brand, worldwide in countries including Argentina, Australia, Brazil, Canada, Finland, Mexico, New Zealand, South Africa, Sweden, and Switzerland, as well as other countries in South America and Western Europe. Its compact size, by American standards, allowed it to be sold as a large car in Europe and elsewhere, without being too large for local conditions.

== First generation (1960–1962) ==
First generation
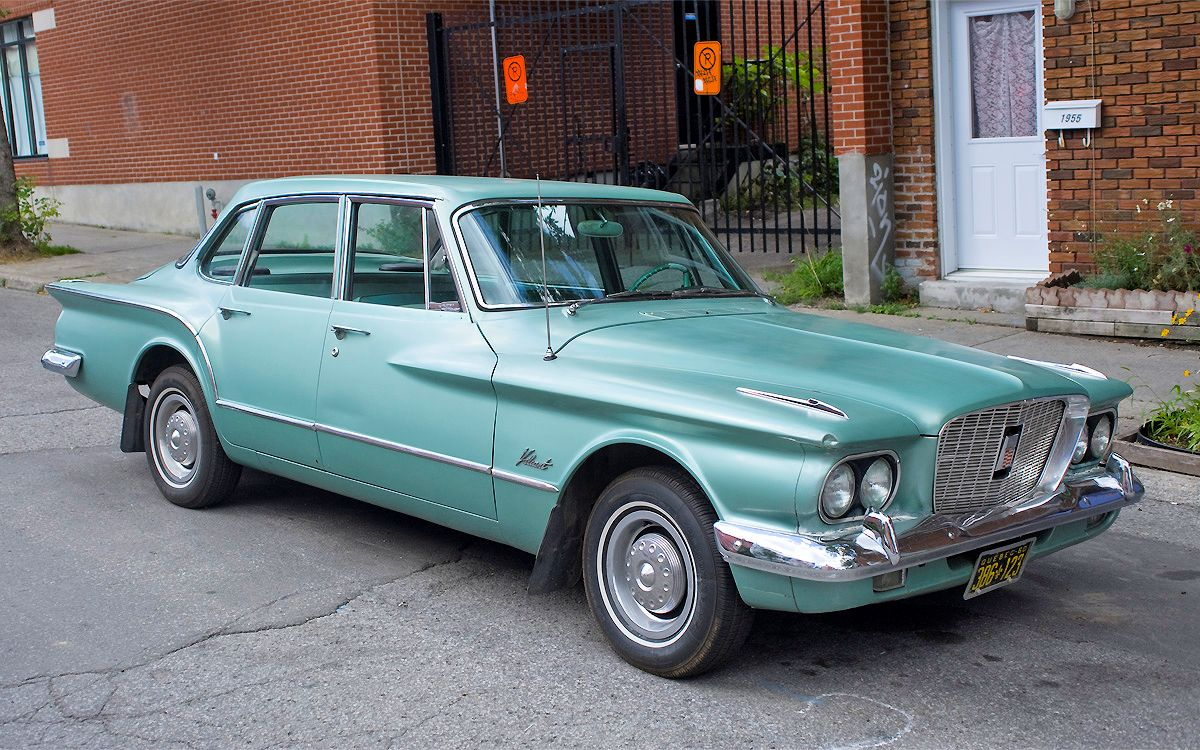
- 1960 Valiant 4-door sedan

Overview
- Production: 1959–1962
- Model years: 1960–1962
- Assembly: United States: Hamtramck, Michigan (Dodge Main Factory); Detroit, Michigan (Lynch Road Assembly); Maywood, California (Los Angeles Assembly); Newark, Delaware (Newark Assembly); Fenton, Missouri (Saint Louis Assembly); Canada: Windsor, Ontario (Windsor Assembly); Netherlands: Rotterdam (NEKAF)
- Designer: Virgil Exner

Body and chassis
- Body style: 4-door 3-seat wagon (1960–1961); 4-door 2-seat wagon (1960–1962); 4-door sedan (1960–1962); 2-door sedan (1961–1962); 2-door hardtop (1961–1962)
- Related: Dodge Lancer; Chrysler Valiant

Powertrain
- Engine: 170 cu in (2.8 L) LG Slant-6 I6; 225 cu in (3.7 L) RG Slant-6 I6
- Transmission: 3-speed manual 3-speed Torqueflite automatic

Dimensions
- Wheelbase: 106.5 in (2,710 mm)
- Length: 183.7 in (4,670 mm)
- Width: 70.4 in (1,790 mm)
- Height: 53.3 in (1,350 mm)
- Curb weight: 2,750 lb (1,250 kg)

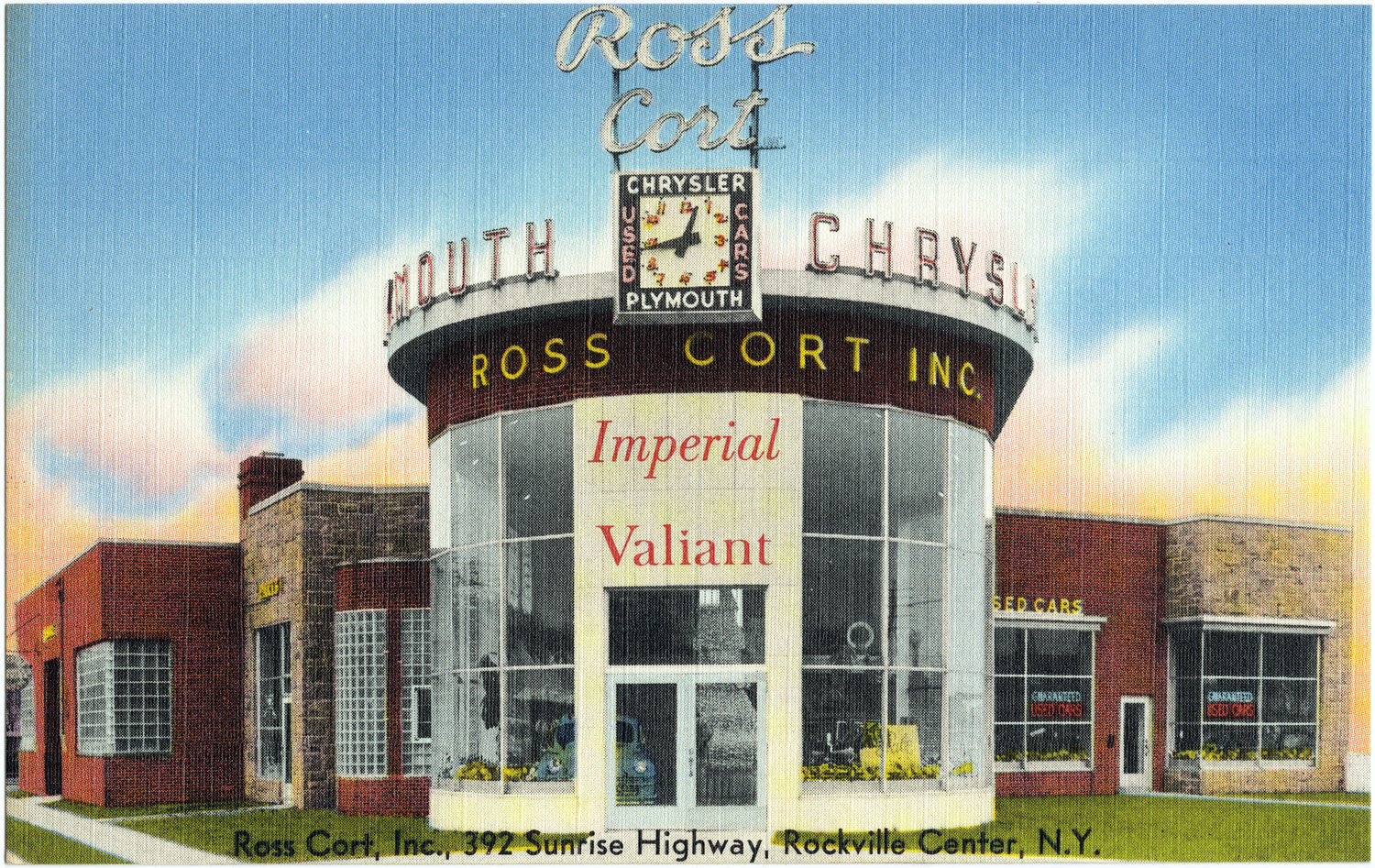
Plymouth Valiant dealer at 392 Sunrise Highway, Rockville Center, NY

In May 1957, Chrysler president Lester Lum "Tex" Colbert established a committee to develop a competitor in the burgeoning compact car market which included the popular VW Beetle, the new American Motors Rambler and upcoming entries from GM, Ford and Studebaker. Design chief Virgil Exner created a car that was smaller and lighter than a full-size car without sacrificing passenger and luggage space. Originally named the "Falcon" after Exner's 1955 Chrysler Falcon concept car, the vehicle was renamed the "Valiant" (which means "having or showing courage or valor") honoring Henry Ford II's request to use the name for the Ford Falcon. The Valiant debuted at the 44th British International Motor Show in London on October 26, 1959. It was introduced as a 1960 model and was officially considered a distinct brand, advertised with the tagline "Nobody's kid brother, this one stands on its own four tires." For the 1961 model year, the Valiant was classified as a Plymouth model. The 1961–62 Dodge Lancer was essentially a rebadged Valiant with different trim and styling details. For the 1962 model year, the Valiant returned without Plymouth branding but was sold only in Plymouth Chrysler, Chrysler Dodge, or the rare standalone Plymouth dealerships. For model year 1964 and onwards the car was sold in the United States only as a Plymouth Valiant.

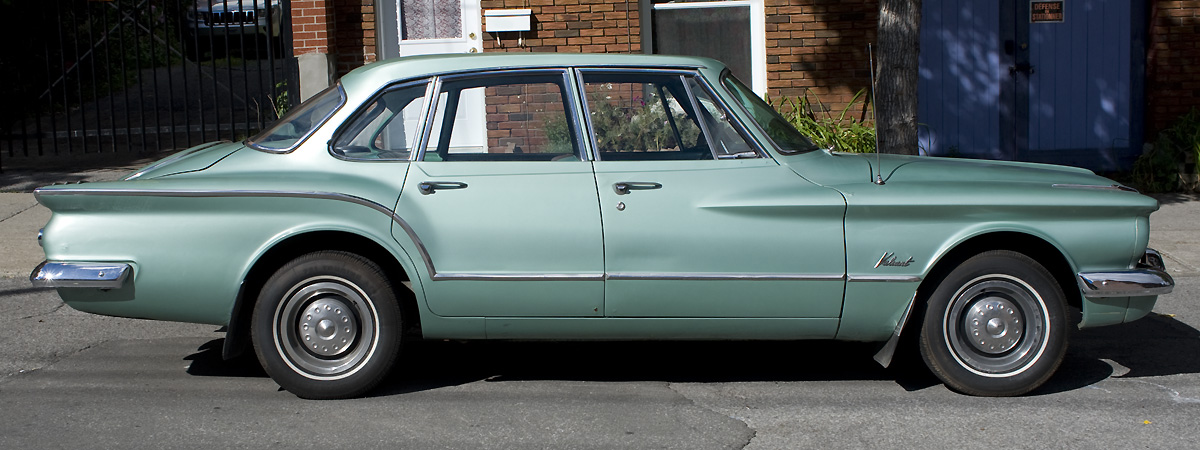
The Valiant displayed distinctive styling including a raked rear window.

The Valiant was less radical in configuration than General Motors' compact Chevrolet Corvair, which had an air-cooled rear-mounted engine, but was considered more aesthetically daring than the also-new Falcon and Studebaker Lark compacts, which had more conventional looks; the Valiant boasted a radical design that continued Exner's "Forward Look" styling with "sleek, crisp lines which flow forward in a dart or wedge shape". The flush-sided appearance was a carried-over feature from Chrysler's Ghia-built D'Elegance and Adventure concept cars which also gave the Valiant additional inches of interior room. The Valiant's styling was new, yet with specific design elements that tied it to other contemporary Chrysler products, such as the canted tailfins tipped with cat's-eye shaped tail lamps and the simulated Continental spare tire pressed into the trunk lid that were thematically similar to those on the Imperial and the 300F. According to Exner, the stamped wheel design was used not only to establish identity with other Chryslers, but to "dress up the rear deck area without detracting from the look of directed forward motion".

The Valiant debuted an all-new six-cylinder overhead-valve engine, the famous slant-six. Its inline cylinders were uniquely canted 30° to the right (passenger side), permitting a lower hoodline. The water pump was shifted from front to alongside, shortening engine length. And an efficient long-branch individual-runner intake manifold was fitted, an advance that benefited from Chrysler's pioneering work in tuned intakes. The slant-six produced both more power and better economy than similar American made economy straight sixes, and it soon gained a reputation for dependability. Project engineer Willem Weertman and his team had designed a simple yet robust workhorse, from its four-main forged crankshaft to a simplified "mechanical" valve train. Block and head castings were unusually thick because both were intended to be cast in either iron or aluminum with the same tooling. Although volume casting techniques of the era could not yet reliably produce complex head castings in aluminum, over 50,000 die-cast aluminum-block versions of the 225 cu in (3.7 L) engine were produced between late 1961 and early 1963 and sold as extra-cost options.

The 1960 Valiant exemplified Chrysler's leadership in aluminum die casting. While the aluminum slant-six engine block did not enter production until 1961, the Kokomo, Indiana, foundry produced a number of other aluminum parts for the 1960 Valiant, all instrumental in reducing the total weight of the car. The 1960 model contained as much as 60 lb (27 kg) of aluminum in structural and decorative forms, with the majority of the material used in cast form as chassis parts. These parts included the oil pump, water pump, alternator housing (the first car to have an alternator), Hyper-Pak (see below) and standard production intake manifolds, all-new Torqueflite A-904 automatic transmission case and tail extension, and numerous other small parts. These cast-aluminum parts were roughly 60% lighter than corresponding parts of cast iron. A cast aluminum part had the benefit of reduced section thickness where strength was not a vital consideration. Section thickness of cast-iron parts were often dictated by casting practice, which required at least 3/16 in (4.8 mm) to ensure good castings. Exterior decorative parts stamped from aluminum were lighter than similar chromium-plated zinc castings. The entire grille and surrounding molding on the Valiant weighed only 3 lb (1.4 kg). If this same assembly had been made of die-cast zinc, as many grilles of the era were, it would have weighed an estimated 13 lb (5.9 kg). An estimated 102 lb (46 kg)—about 4% of a Valiant's total shipping weight—was saved with the 60 lb (27 kg) of aluminum parts.

The Valiant A-body platform used "unit-body" or "unibody" construction (not used by the Chrysler Corporation since the Airflow models of the 1930s) rather than "body-on-frame" construction. Instead of a bolted-in forestructure used in other unibody designs, the Valiant incorporated a welded-in front understructure and stressed front sheet metal. The fenders, quarter panels, floor and roof contributed to the stiffness of the body shell. A unit wheelbase comparison showed the Valiant to be 95% stiffer in torsion and 50% stiffer in beam than a 1959 Plymouth with separate body-on-frame construction. Dynamic testing showed that high structural resonant frequencies were attained, indicating greater damping and reduced body shake.

The front suspension consisted of unequal length control arms with torsion bars, while the rear suspension used a live axle supported by asymmetric leaf springs. Chrysler used this design through the entire production of the Valiant and other A-body models, with revisions to the suspension components themselves for the 1962, 1967, 1968, and 1973 models.

=== Hyper-Pak ===
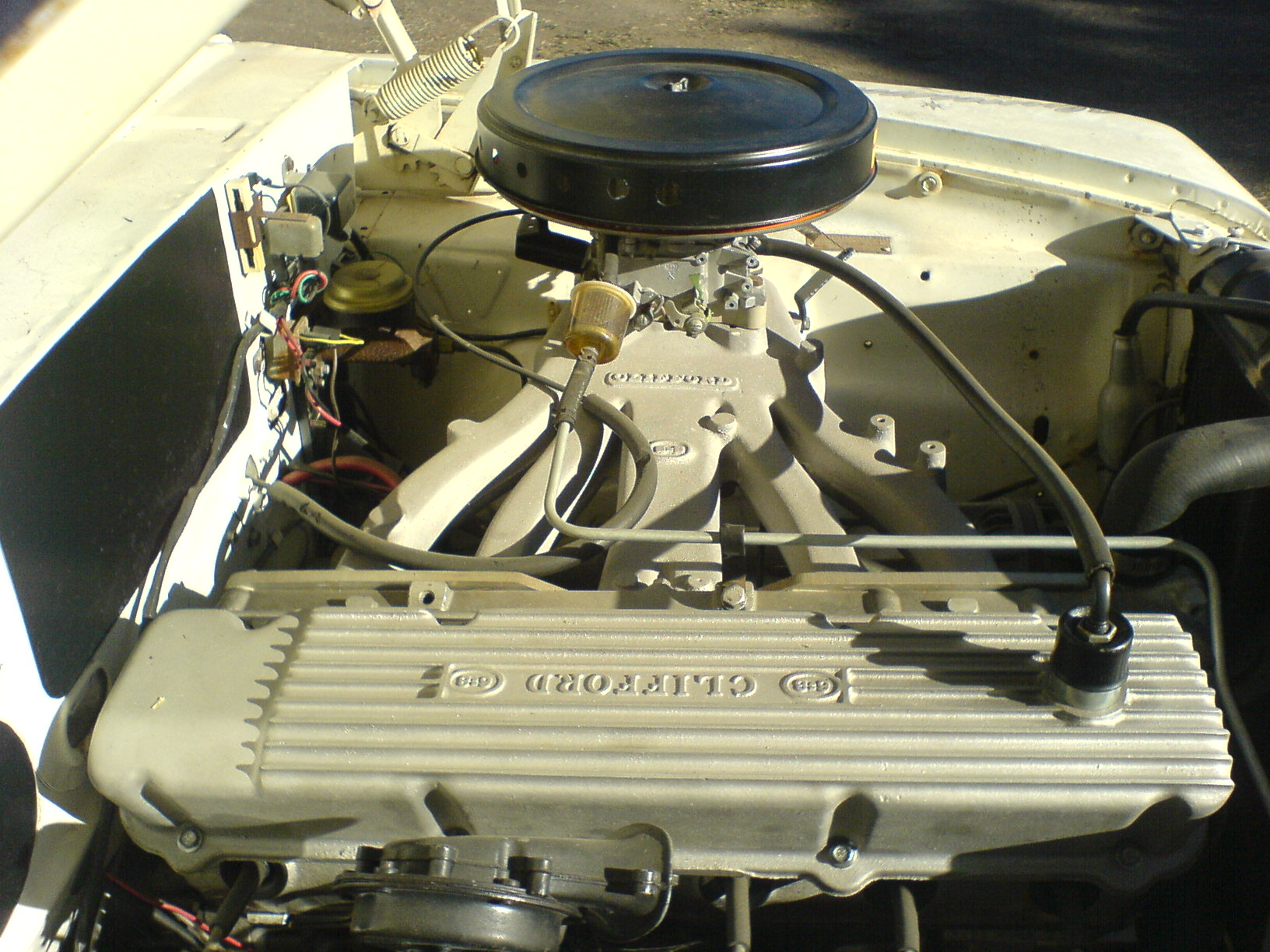
An all-aluminum slant-6 engine with reproduction Hyper Pak intake manifold

Plymouth product planning director Jack Charipar gave impetus for a stock car racing version of the Valiant, and while Chrysler engineers developed the Hyper-Pak for the track, the Hyper-Pak dealer tuning kit option was made available in limited quantities on December 1, 1959. Features included 153 lb⋅ft (207 N⋅m) of torque, a 10.5:1 compression ratio, dual exhaust pipes on a single muffler, a manual choke and a larger 15 US gal (57 L) fuel tank. Dick Maxwell, a Chrysler engineer responsible for many of the super stock Mopars, recalls that "When NASCAR decided to run a compact road race in conjunction with the 1960 Daytona 500, all the factories got involved. We built a fleet of seven Hyper Pak Valiants with 148-hp 170-ci [Slant] sixes having a single four-barrel with ram manifold." The race Hyper-Paks also featured high-load valve springs and long-duration, high-lift camshafts.

NASCAR's new compact car category debuted at the Daytona International Speedway on January 31, 1960. The first of two races was a road course, which used a 1.5 mi (2.4 km) portion of the high-banked tri-oval together with a twisting infield road for a lap distance of 3.81 mi (6.13 km). The race length was 10 laps, 38.1 mi (61.3 km). Averaging a speed of 88.134 mph (141.838 km/h), Marvin Panch drove his Hyper-Pak into first place; all the Hyper-Paks swept the field taking the first seven places. The second race of the day used only the tri-oval track, 20 laps on its full 2.5 mi (4.0 km) length totaling 50 mi (80 km). A multi-car accident on the fourth lap took out the four Valiant leaders including one driven by Richard Petty. Panch was not among them because car trouble delayed his start and he was busy passing slower cars from the rear of the field when the leaders crashed. After a restart, Panch worked to first place and stayed there, averaging a speed of 122.282 mph (196.794 km/h). The remaining Valiants placed 1-2-3 and Panch again went into the winner's circle. Maxwell again recalls that "It was a Plymouth runway. We finished first through seventh. Our cars were so fast, NASCAR never did that race again."

=== Station Wagon ===
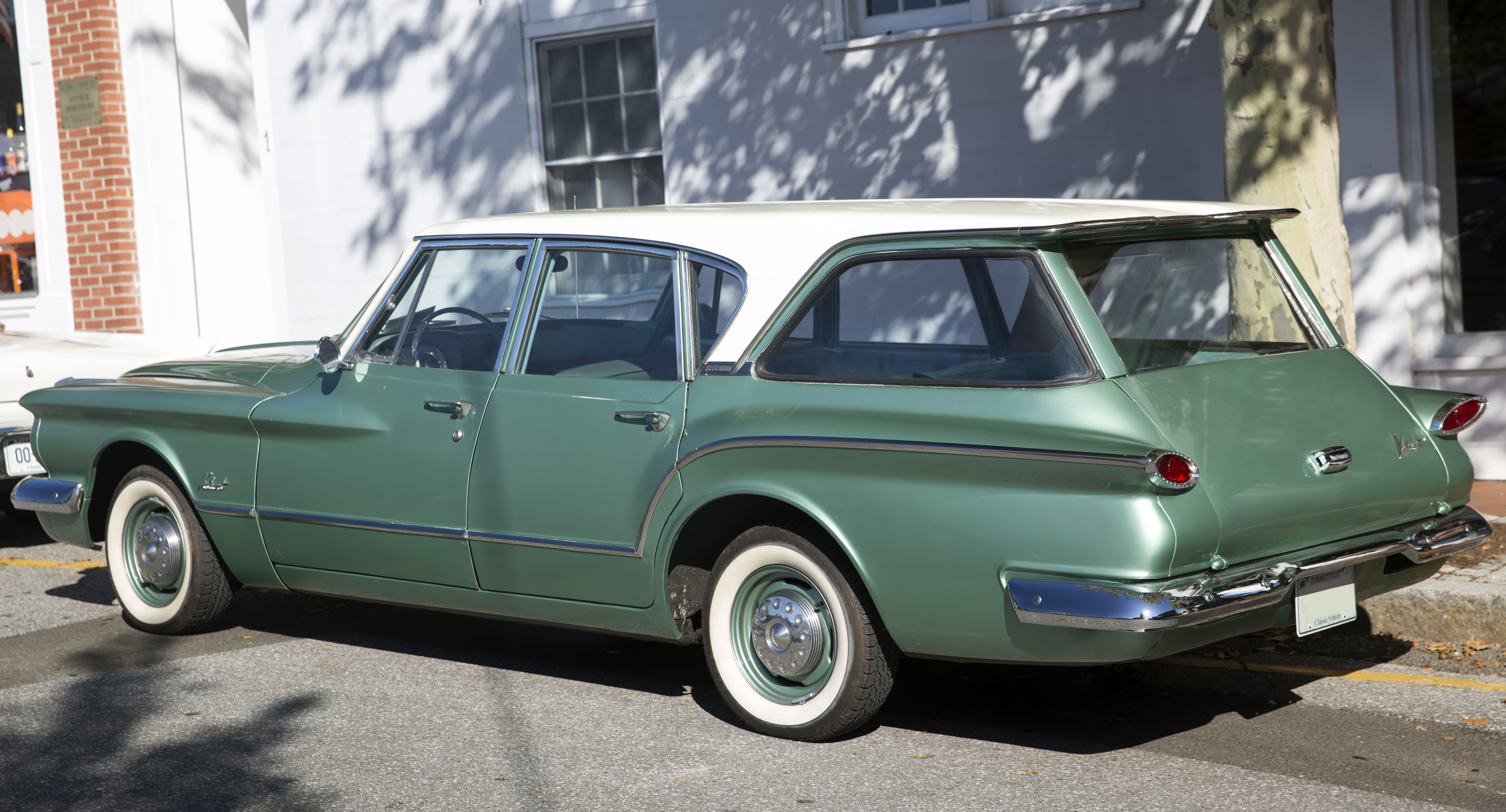
1960 Valiant V-200 Suburban

The Valiant station wagons had 72.3 ft^{3} (2.0 m^{3}) of cargo space yet required two feet less parking space than a full-size Plymouth. A locking luggage compartment on the two-seat models included the use of "Captive-Aire" (run-flat) tires. The compartment, located in the cargo deck, served as a spare tire storage space for models equipped with standard tires in which case the lock was optional. Captive-Aire tires, which did not require a spare, were standard equipment on the three-seat models. An aluminum tailgate window screen was available for the exclusion of insects when on vacation and camping trips.

The four-door station wagon, assembled only at the Dodge main plant in Hamtramck, was available in V100 and V200 trim in two- and three-seat configurations; the third seat faced the rear. Both models were the lowest priced four-door station wagons in America. The two-seat model was $60 under both the four-door Lark and Rambler station wagons, and the three-seater was $186 below the Rambler four-door.

=== Design and mechanical revisions ===
The first-generation Valiants, though sold in three model years, existed in four distinct configurations: early 1960, late 1960, 1961, and 1962. The base-model V100 cars received relatively minimal ornamentation.

==== 1960 ====
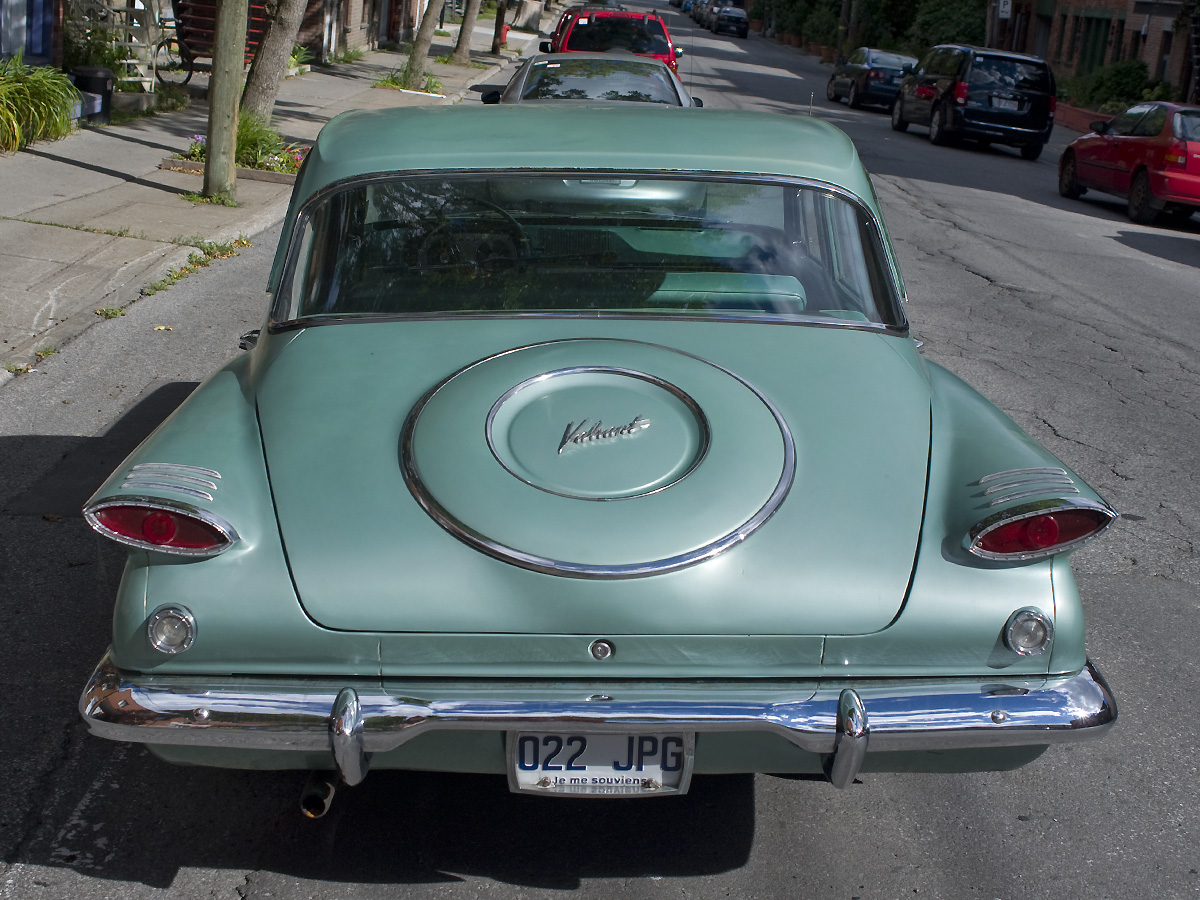
1960 back showing the spare-tire stamping on the trunk lid

Early 1960 models, particularly the V200 high-trim cars, featured extensive brightwork and ornamentation. An 8 in (20 cm) chrome spear atop each front fender, an inner reveal ring on the trunk lid's spare tire stamping, a "V200" nameplate on the dashboard, and stainless steel windshield and back window reveal moldings, which were deleted from production, replaced with less costly flexible mylar-faced plastic locking strips—in approximately January, 1960. Early and late V200s had a continuous stainless steel molding following the tailfin crease as it swept down in front of the rear wheel, then continuing forward along the lower break line in both doors and the front fender. The radiator grille was brite-dipped stamped aluminum, and a central grille badge doubled as the hood release. Script "Valiant" callouts were placed in the center of the deck lid's spare-tire stamping and on each front fender.

During the 1960 model year, there were revisions to improve lubrication of the two rear connecting rods, voltage regulator function, cold starting and idling, acceleration, and to prevent breakage of the front and rear manifold mounting studs.

==== 1961 ====
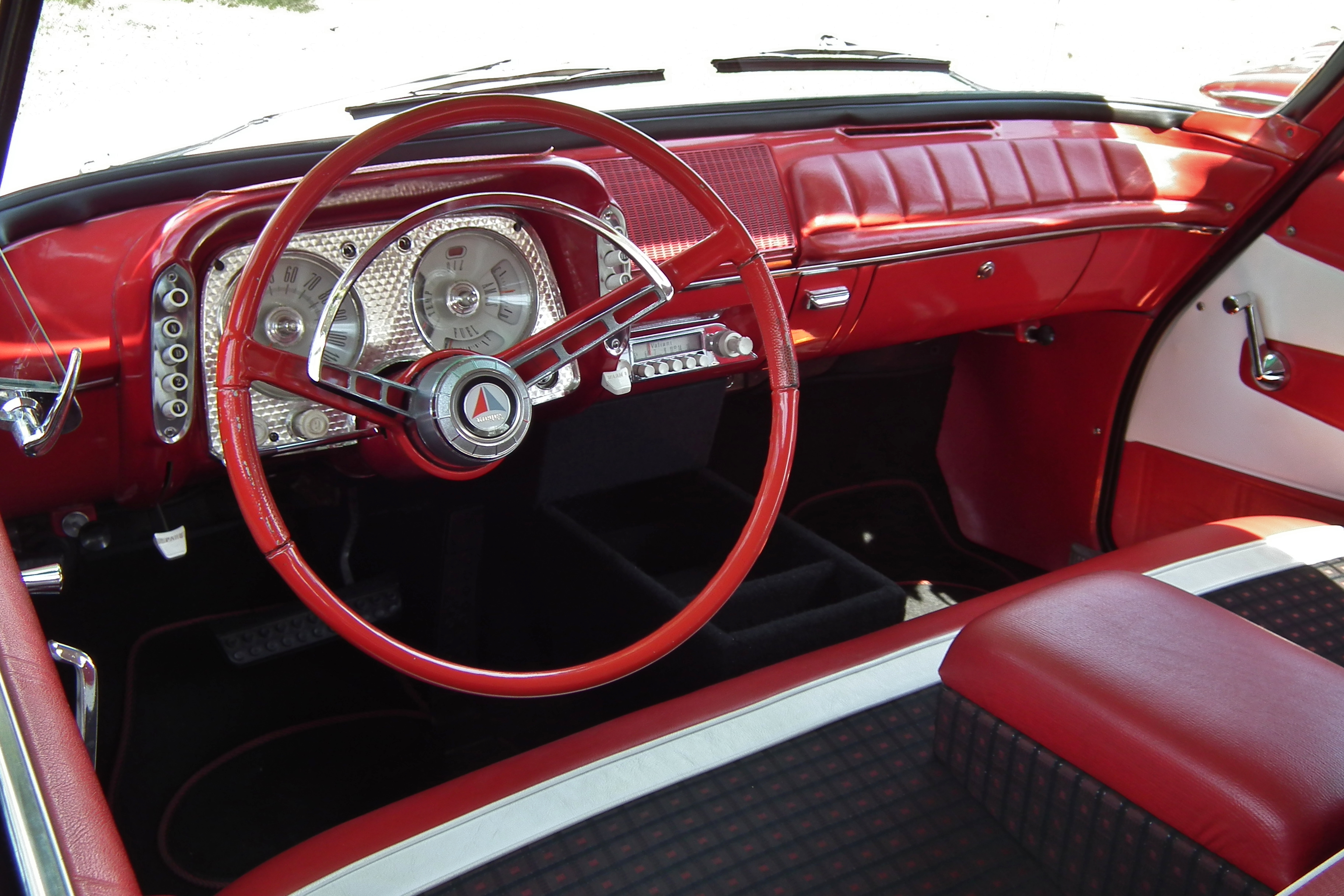
1961 Valiant V-200 interior

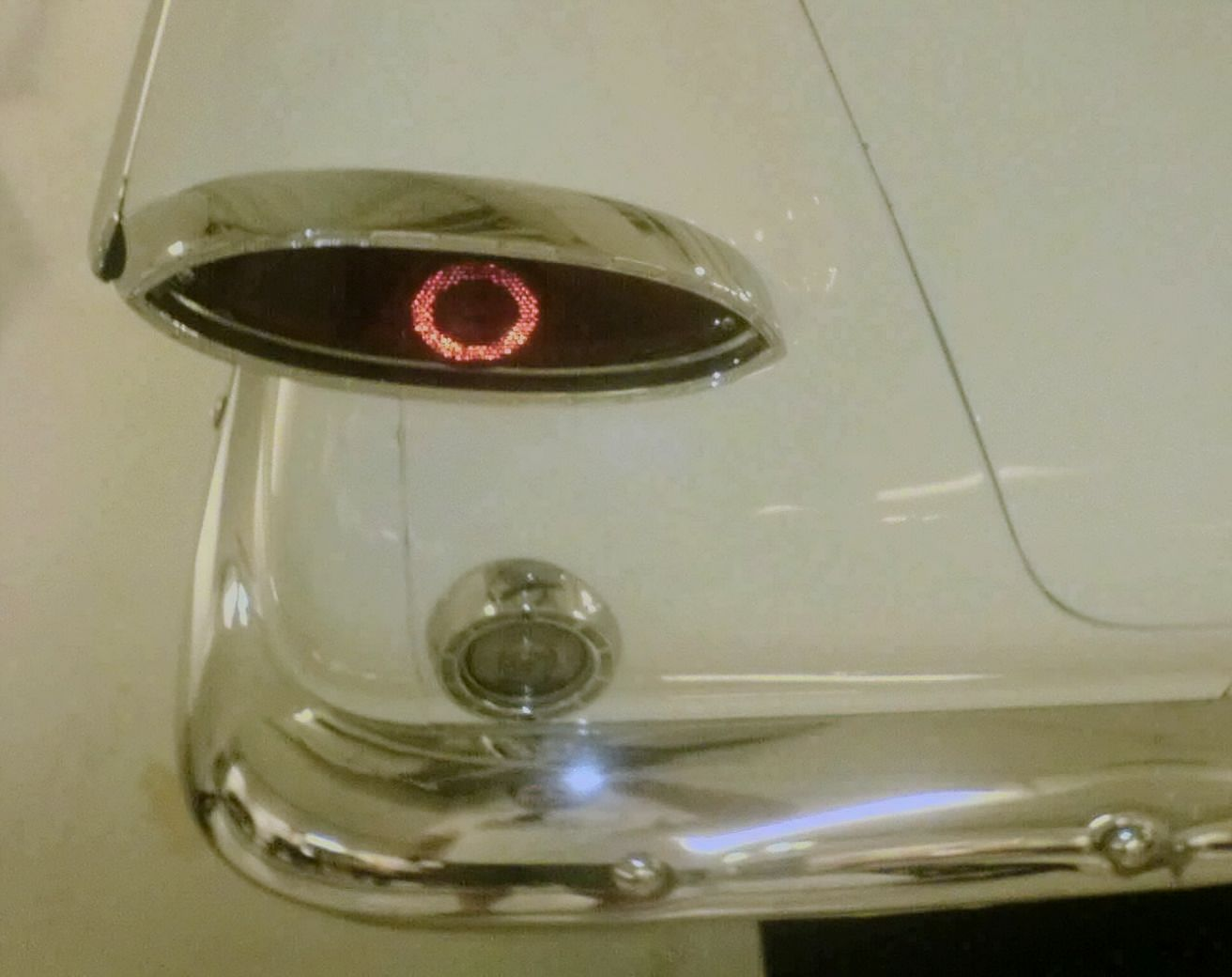
1960–61 tail lamp with back-up lamp below

For 1961, new two-door sedan and hardtop models were released, but no changes were made to the four-door sedan and wagon sheet metal. The interior and exterior trim were changed to provide model year differentiation, a mild form of planned obsolescence. The radiator grille stamping was the same as in 1960, but for 1961 it was painted with a pattern of black squares. The central grille ornament was still pulled from the bottom to release the hood, but it was now faced with an emblem having a white field with the blue-and-red stylized "V" logo, rather than 1960's red placard with a gold script reading "Valiant". The side trim was changed; a 10 in (25 cm) stainless spear was placed at the rear of each tailfin crease, a hockey stick-shaped trim was applied to the lower break line, and the front fender/door crease was capped with a long stainless spear. The tailfins were each topped with three transverse chrome strips, and a large horizontal emblem containing a round plastic "V200" callout was centered in the deck lid's spare-tire stamping. Matching round "V200" callouts were placed in round housings at the midpoint of the front fender spears. Inside the car, the instrument cluster was largely carried over, but 1960's black gauges with white callouts gave way to 1961's white gauges with black callouts. For the first time, Valiants wore "Plymouth" script just left of the right-side taillight.

Mechanical revisions for 1961 included new carburetors, the availability of positive crankcase ventilation (which was newly mandated on cars sold in California), the availability of dealer-installed air conditioning, the relocation of the alternator from the left to the right side of the engine, and extensive revisions throughout most of the Valiant's systems and components. Late in the 1961 model year, the larger 225 cu in (3.7 L) slant-six engine became available in the Valiant, its use having been expanded earlier in the year from the larger Dodges and Plymouths to the Valiant-sized Dodge Lancer.

==== 1962 ====
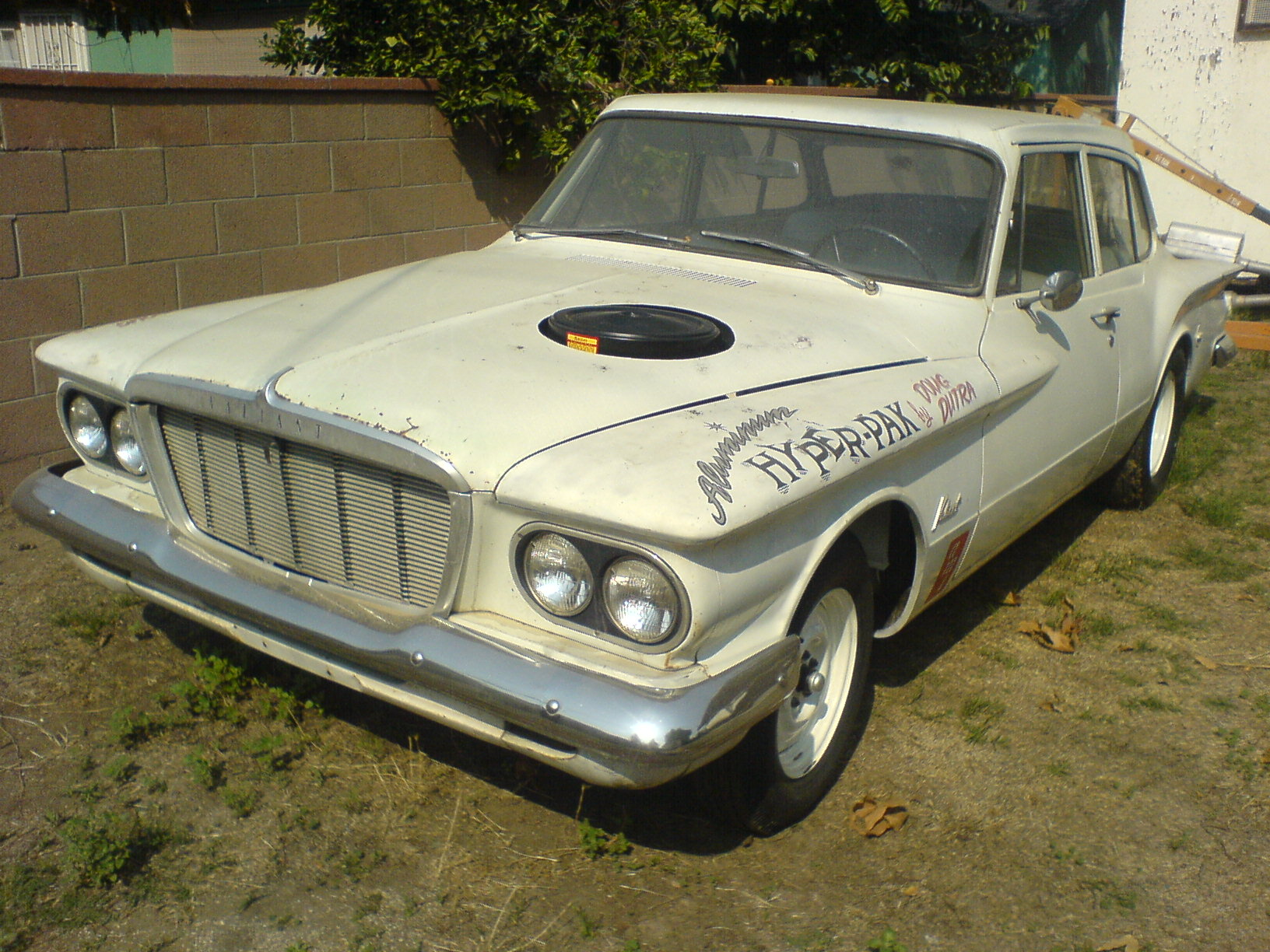
Modified 1962 Valiant with Hyper Pak

The 1962 model year saw an extensive facelift. The radiator grille was flattened and shortened. The hood release was moved to a knob at the top of the grille frame. The central grille emblem was deleted, except on the top-line Signet 200 two-door hardtop model, which received a black-painted grille with a round central emblem incorporating the red-and-blue stylized "V" Valiant emblem. The Signet 200 had pleated, leather-like bucket seats, custom tailored interior trim, deep-pile carpeting, special trunk lid emblem, different headlamp frames and special side moldings; it was America's lowest-priced hardtop with bucket seats.

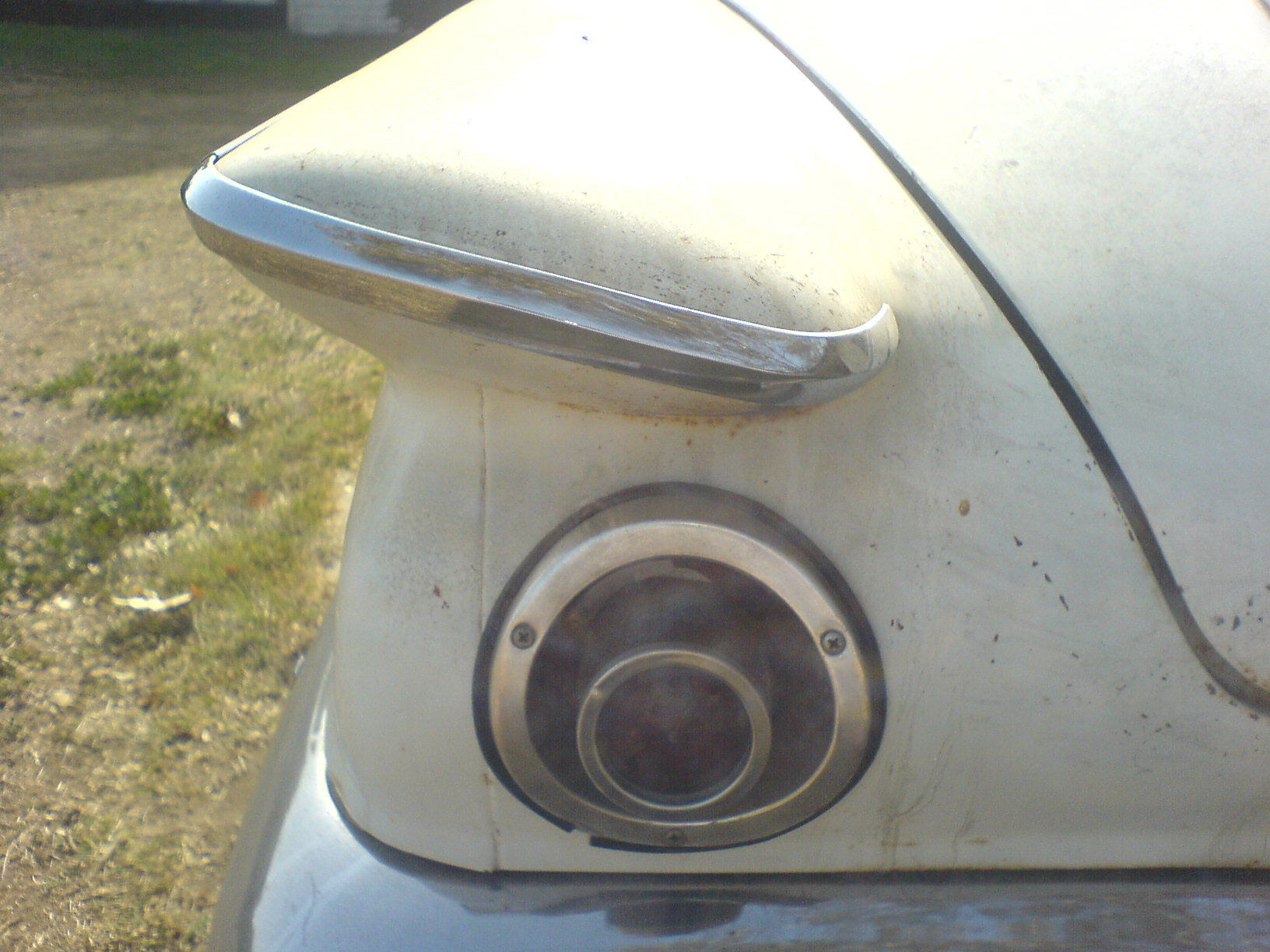
1962 tail lamp

Fender and hood stampings were similar to the 1960-61 items, but neither identical nor interchangeable. At the rear, the cat's-eye tail lamps were deleted. A wraparound stainless trim was applied to the tailfins, below which were placed round tail lamps set into stamped aluminum bezels. These occupied the space formerly available for optional backup lamps, which for 1962 flanked the license plate below the rear bumper. The spare-tire stamping was eliminated from the deck lid, which was now a smooth stamping with a small central ridge at its trailing edge. On V200 deck lids, a large round emblem surrounded an oblong block-letter "Valiant" callout on a black field. Similar block-letter/black-field callouts were placed on each front fender. On the Signet, the deck lid was adorned with a smaller round emblem surrounding the red-and-blue stylized "V" logo. The "Plymouth" script disappeared from the 1962 Valiant, as in 1960.

V200 side trim reverted to the 1960 concept, following the tailfin crease and lower body break crease. However, the 1962 trim was more massive and contained an oblong triple-window effect at the rear of the body break crease. On Signets, the front fenders had an open-centered double spear, connected at the front and back, within which was contained a secondary body paint color.

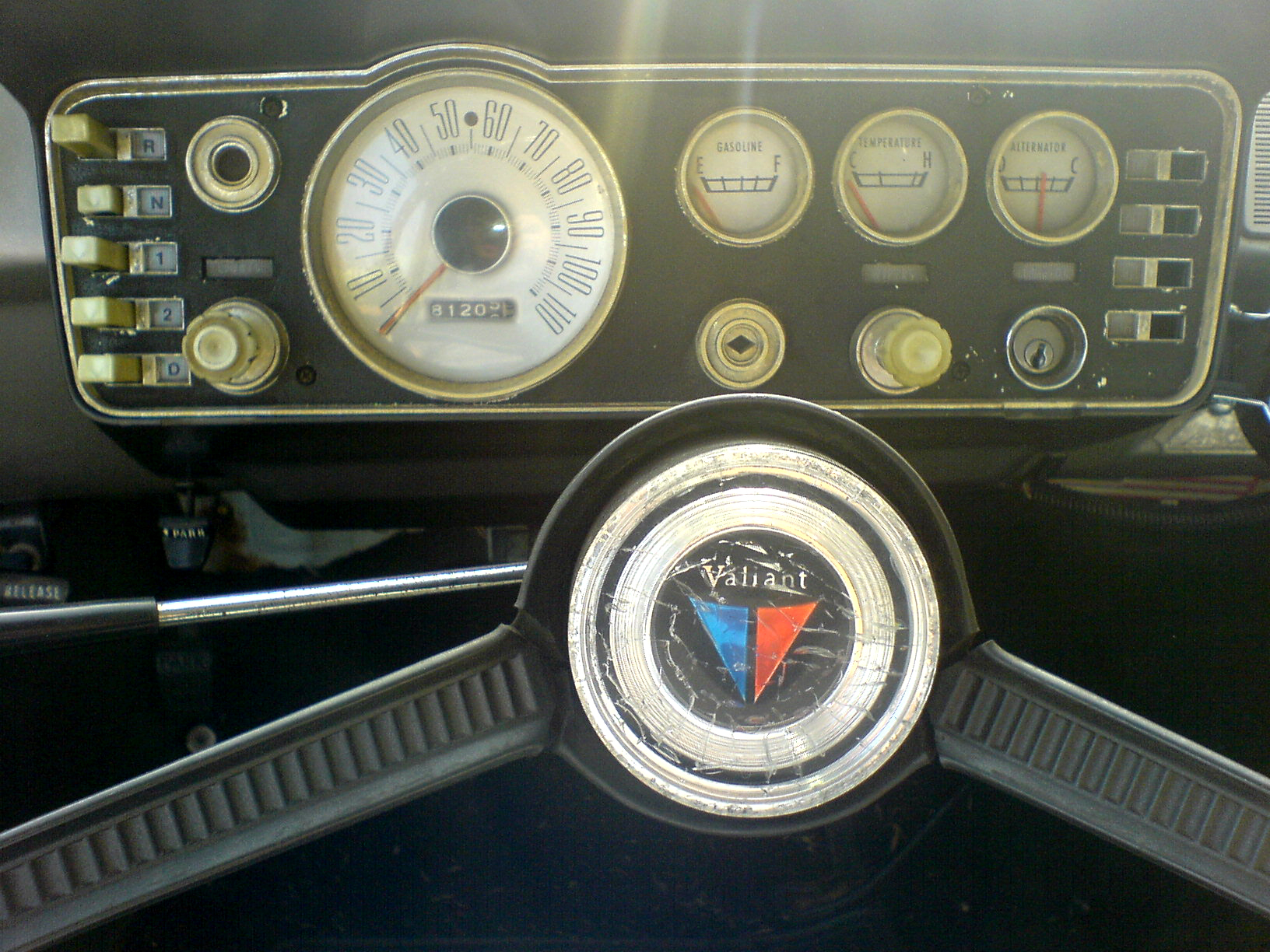
1962 instrument cluster—transmission pushbuttons on the left

The 1962 Valiant was given a completely new asymmetric instrument cluster. Like that of the larger 1962 Plymouth models, the new Valiant cluster was highly regarded for its clean design and easy readability. A large round speedometer was placed at the left of the cluster, with separate round gauges for fuel level, engine temperature, and charging system condition (amperes) in a row to the right of the speedometer. Automatic transmission pushbuttons were in a column at the left edge of the panel, and heater pushbuttons were in a column at the right edge. A new shallower-dish steering wheel was also introduced.

Mechanical revisions for 1962 were extensive. The electrical system was extensively upgraded, with a new gear-reduction starter, new alternator, more fuses, and printed circuit boards rather than individual wires for the instrument cluster. Carburetors were improved again, the manual transmission gearshift was moved from the floor to the steering column, there were new 45°-shear engine mounts replacing the previous vertical-shear items, exhaust systems were made of more corrosion-resistant (aluminized) materials, and axle ratios were altered for better fuel economy. Manual steering ratio was changed from 20:1 to 24:1, and both power and manual steering gearboxes were new, the latter now housed in aluminum rather than iron. Most of the front suspension components were redesigned (now with balloon seals, an industry first), and it was claimed they needed lubrication only every 32,000 mi (51,000 km).

=== Accolade ===
In October 1961, the Society of Illustrators presented Exner the 1962 Styling Award for outstanding design of the 1962 Signet 200; the award lauded Exner's "creative sculpted design" of the Valiant, "an automobile of outstanding originality, restraint and spirited beauty".

== Second generation (1963–1966) ==
Second generation
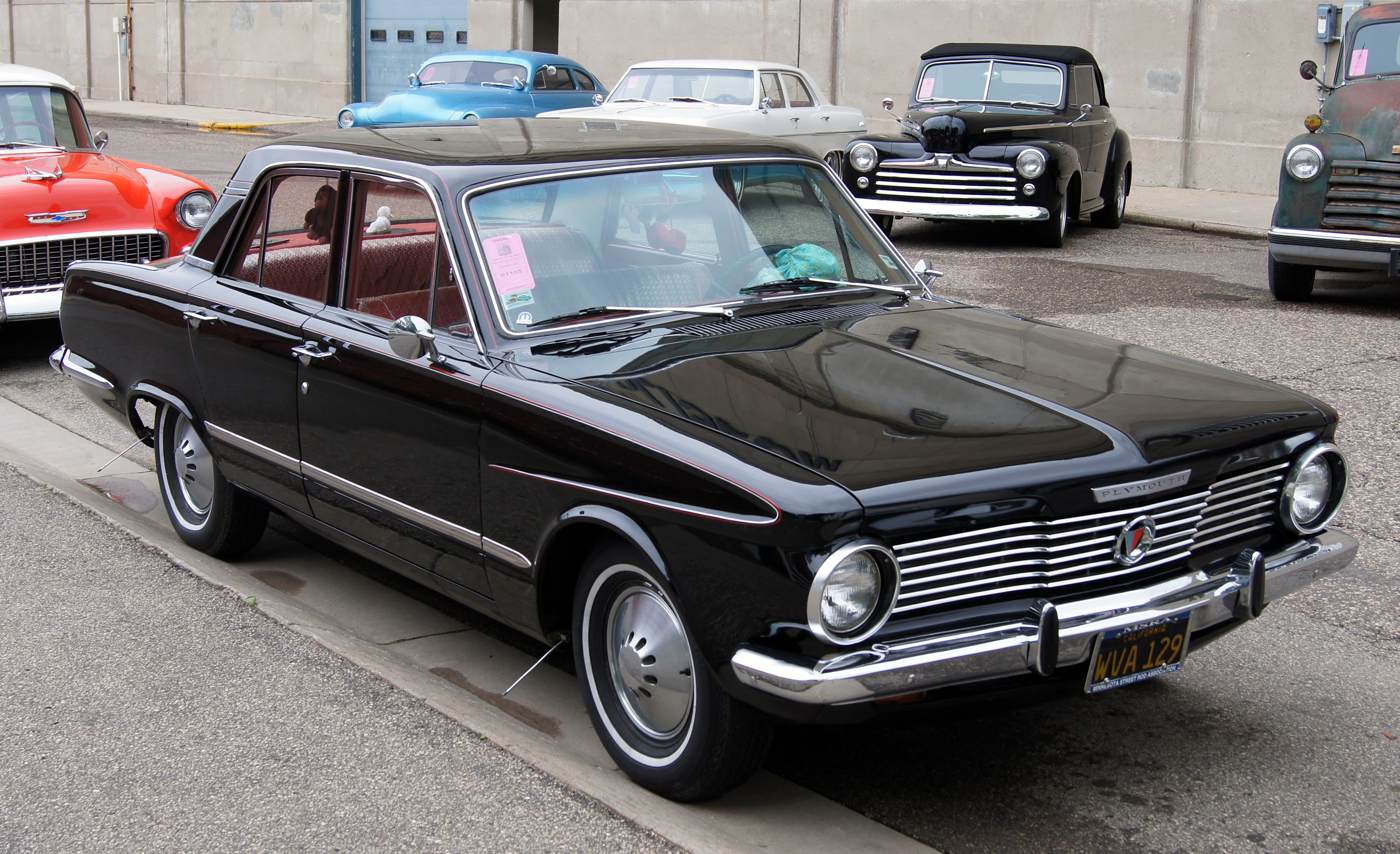
- 1964 Plymouth Valiant 4-Door sedan. This example has 1971 Valiant wheel covers.

Overview
- Production: 1962–1966
- Model years: 1963–1966
- Assembly: United States: Hamtramck, Michigan (Dodge Main Factory); Maywood, California (Los Angeles Assembly); Detroit, Michigan (Lynch Road Assembly); Newark, Delaware (Newark Assembly); Fenton, Missouri (Saint Louis Assembly); Canada: Windsor, Ontario (Windsor Assembly); Mexico: Mexico City (Lago Alberto Assembly); Sweden: Nyköping (Saab-ANA)
- Designer: Elwood Engel

Body and chassis
- Body style: 4-door 2-seat wagon 4-door sedan 2-door sedan 2-door hardtop 2-door convertible
- Related: Dodge Dart; Plymouth Barracuda; Chrysler Valiant

Powertrain
- Engine: 170 cu in (2.8 L) LG Slant-6 I6; 225 cu in (3.7 L) RG Slant-6 I6; 273 cu in (4.5 L) LA V8
- Transmission: A833 4-speed manual A904 TorqueFlite 3-speed automatic

Dimensions
- Wheelbase: 106 in (2,692.4 mm)

The Valiant was totally reskinned for 1963 with a 0.5 in (13 mm) shorter wheelbase; it had a wide, flat hood and a flat square rear deck. The upper belt feature line ran from the rear body, in a gentle sweep, to the front fender tip. Here it was "veed" back and down to the trailing edge of the front fender. The roofline was flatter and sharpened in profile. The grille was a variation of the inverted trapezoid shape that characterized contemporary Chryslers, with a fine mesh insert. Advances in body structure, many accessories and a new spring-staged choke were promotional highlights. The Valiant was offered as a two-door hardtop and convertible, a two- or four-door sedan, and a four-door station wagon. The hardtop and the convertible, with manual- or optional power-operated top, were offered only in the high V200 and premium Signet trim levels. The optional 225 cu in (3.7 L) slant-six engine was initially offered with the die-cast aluminum block introduced in late 1961, but early in the 1963 model year the aluminum block was discontinued; both the 170 and 225 engines were thenceforth available only with iron blocks. In December 1962, Plymouth's first-ever vinyl-covered roof became available as an option on the Signet. The 1963 Valiant was much better received by the public, and sales for the year rose to 225,056. The Valiant was sold in Mexico as a "Chrysler Valiant" starting with the 1963 model year. This was also the first year that it was coupled with the Dodge Dart, which had been previously a lower-end full-size model. In the U.S., the Valiant finally joined the Plymouth brand for the rest of its production.

Building on a worldwide record sales success in 1963, the Valiant moved into 1964 with design changes giving better economy, reliability and performance. Changes in the 1964 Valiant included a restyled front end featuring a new grille with a horizontal bars. A "Valiant" medallion was placed at the center of the grille where the bars formed a flat bulge. Vertical taillamps replaced the previous horizontal items. The ring-style rear deck decoration was replaced with a Valiant script located at the right-hand corner. There were few styling changes in the 1965 Valiants, but the 1966 Valiants had significant superficial changes: a split grille with fine-patterned insert; new front fenders; new rear fenders on the sedans; new bevelled-edge rear deck lid; heavier rear bumper; and a new roofline with large rear window.

The new Chrysler-built A833 four-speed manual transmission was offered together with a Hurst shifter. Another new option was the "Sure-Grip" limited-slip differential, which was touted as a bad-weather safety feature and also offered traction benefits in performance driving.

Plymouth supported a successful team of Valiant two-door sedans in the 1965 and 1966 SCCA Manufacturers Rally Championships.

=== V8 engine ===
In mid-1964, Chrysler released an all-new 273 cu in (4.5 L) V8 engine as optional equipment in all Valiants. This compact V8 engine, with solid tappets, the first in Chrysler's LA engine range and that would last until 2002, was specifically engineered to fit in the compact A-body engine compartment. Valiants with the optional 273 engine came with V-shaped emblems at the sides of the cowl. With the 180 bhp (130 kW) 273, the Valiant became the lowest-priced V-8 automobile in the world. For 1965, a hotter 235 bhp (175 kW) version of the 273 called the Commando 273 was made available with 10.5:1 compression, a four-barrel carburetor, performance camshaft, low restriction exhaust and other modifications.

The Dodge Lancer, which had been almost identical to the Valiants of 1961–62, was replaced in 1963 by the Dart. The Dart was available in all the same body styles as the Valiant, except there was no Dodge equivalent of the Barracuda. All Darts used a larger, 111 in (2,800 mm) wheelbase, except for wagons which used the Valiant's 106 in (2,700 mm) wheelbase.

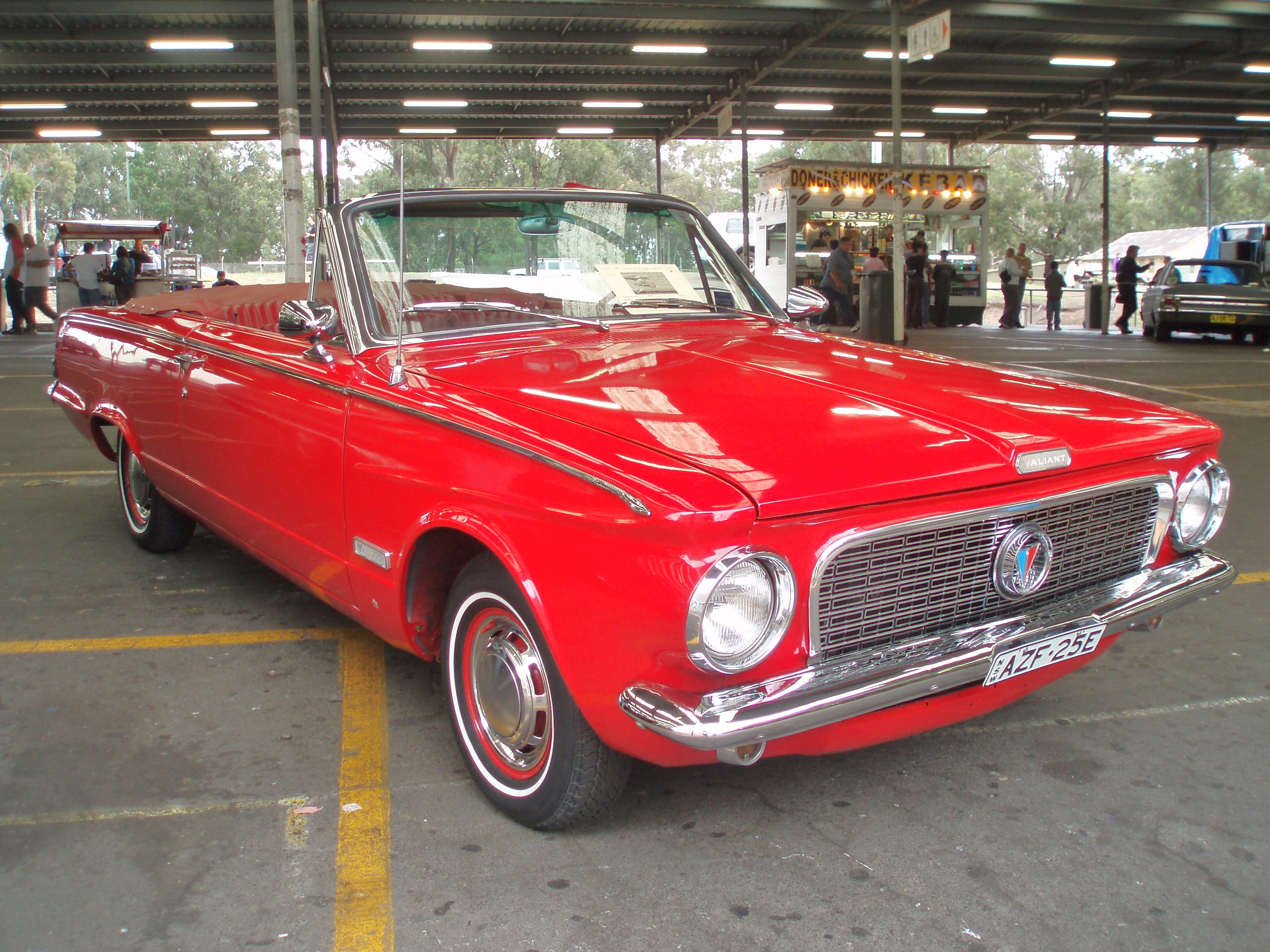
1963 Plymouth Valiant Signet V-200 convertible

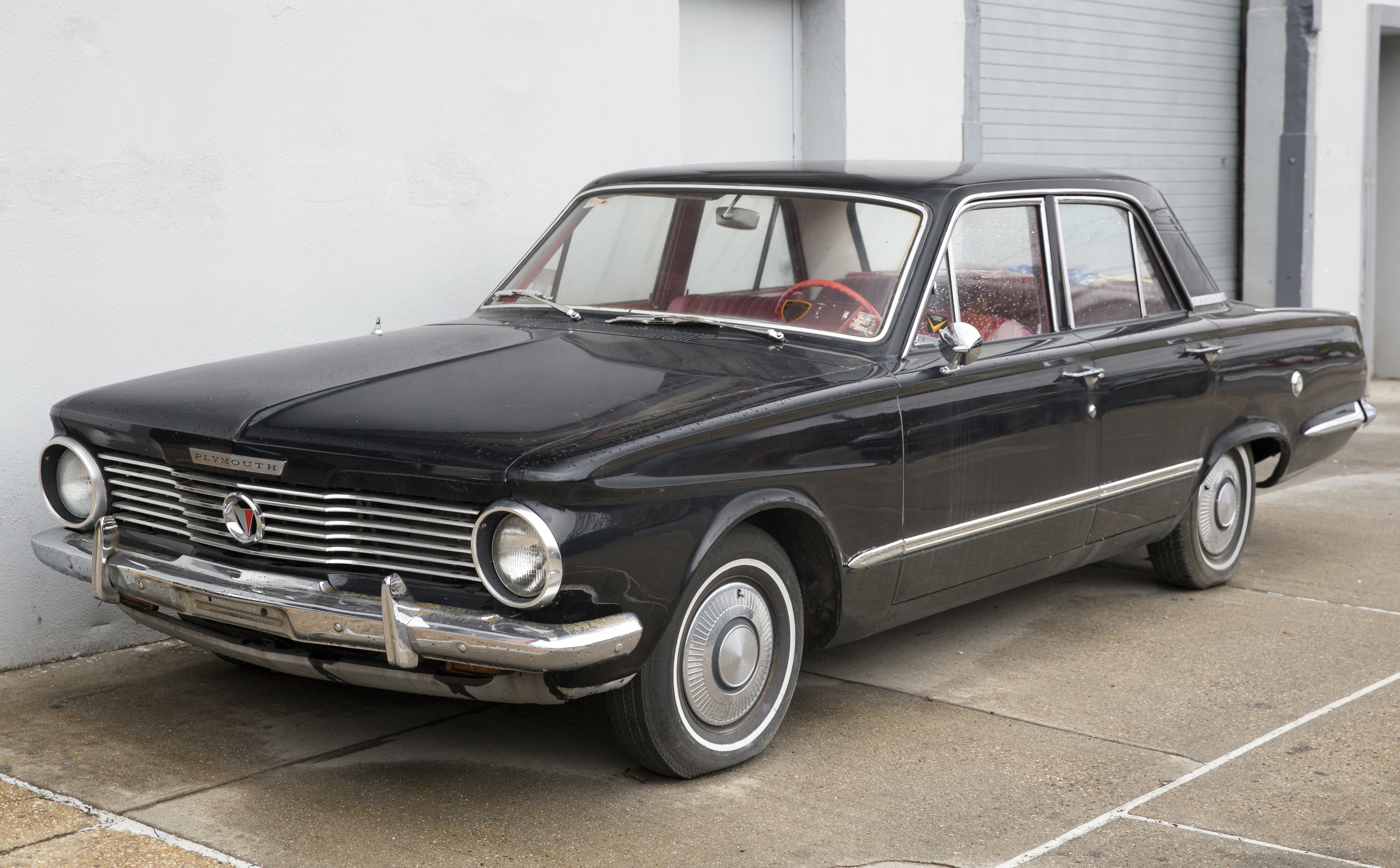
1964 Plymouth Valiant V-200 4 Door Sedan

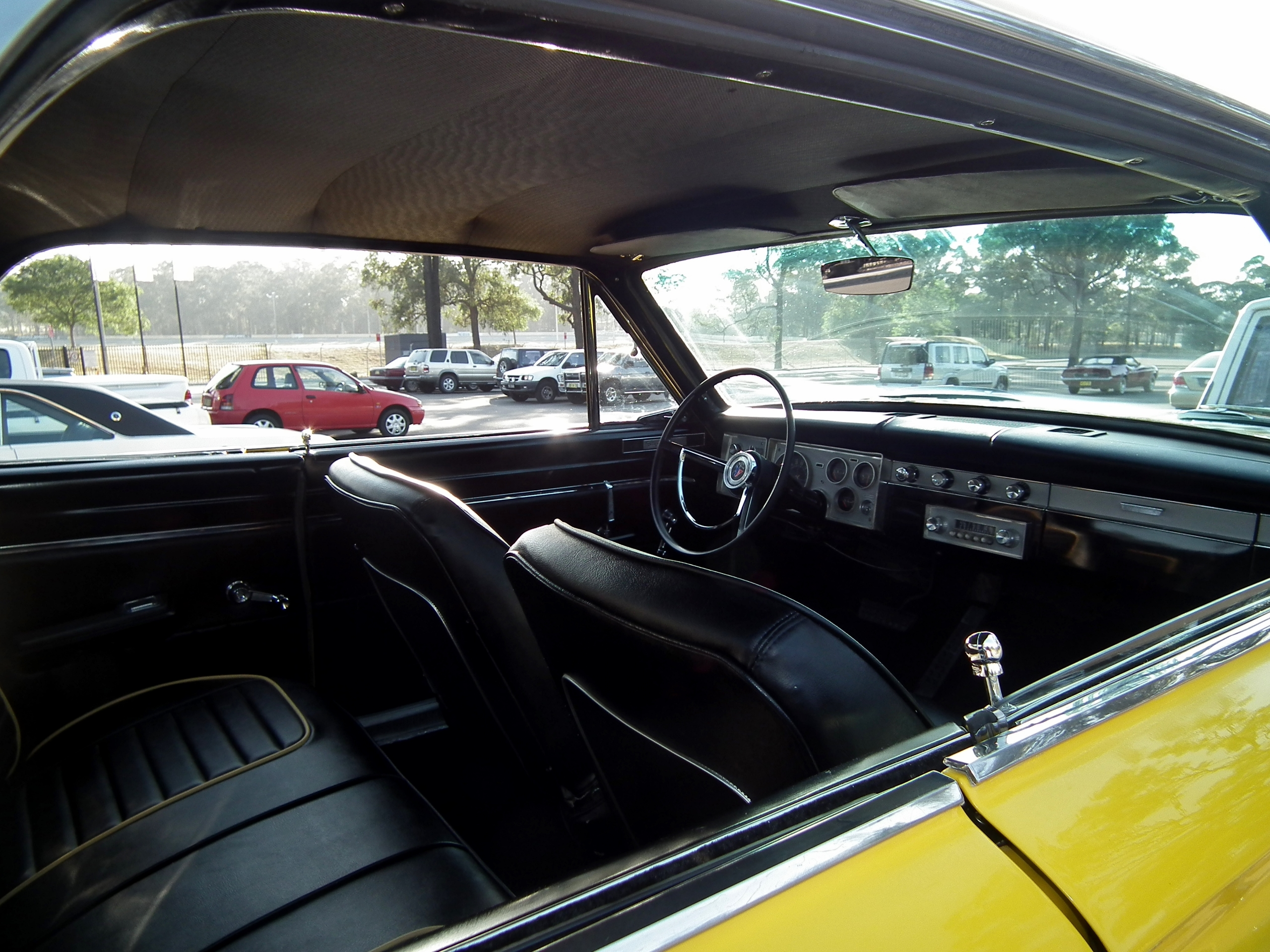
1964 Plymouth Valiant Signet V-200 hardtop interior

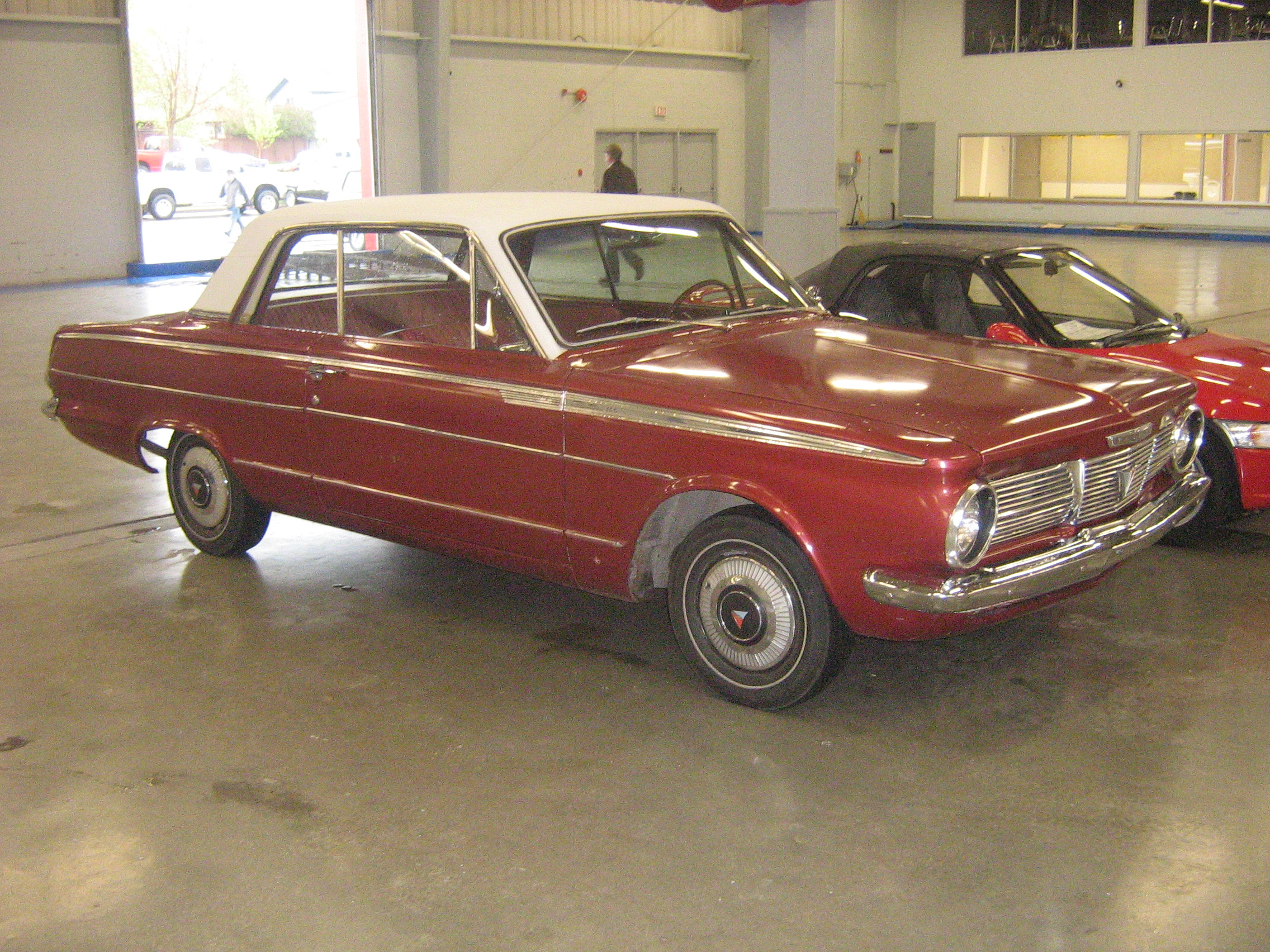
1965 Plymouth Valiant V-200 2-door hardtop

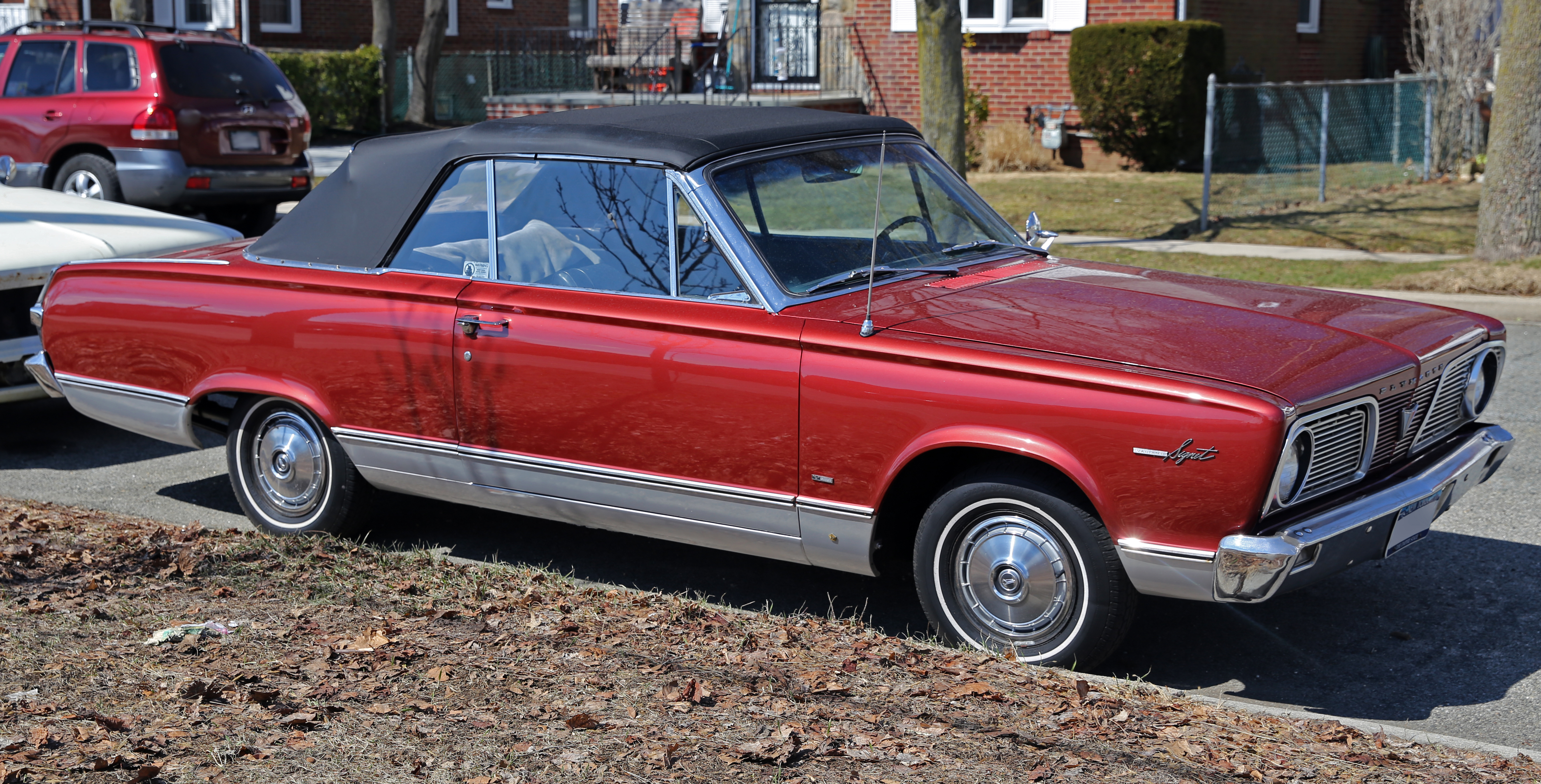
1966 Plymouth Valiant Signet convertible

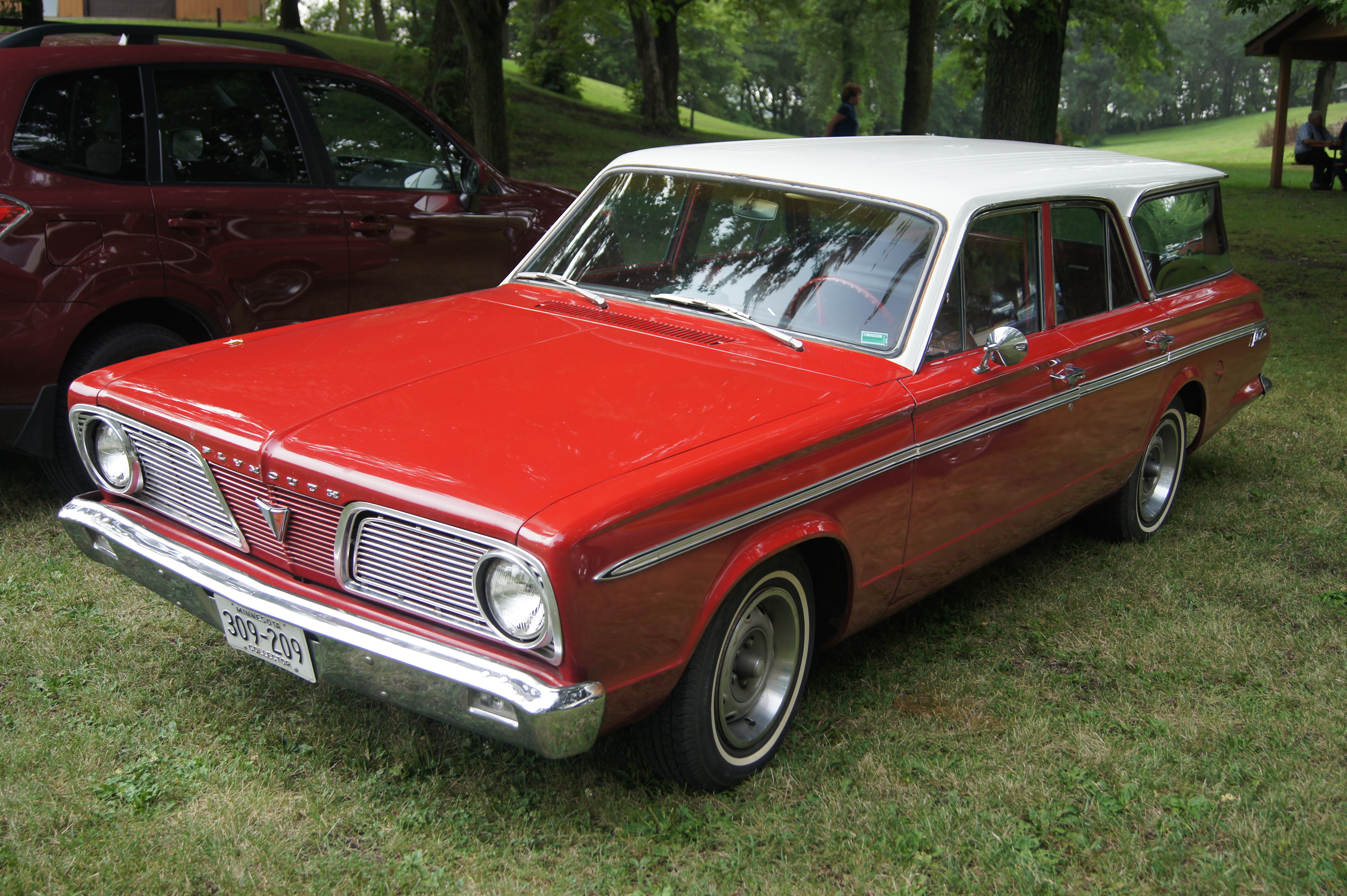
1966 Plymouth Valiant wagon

== Third generation (1967–1973) ==
Third generation
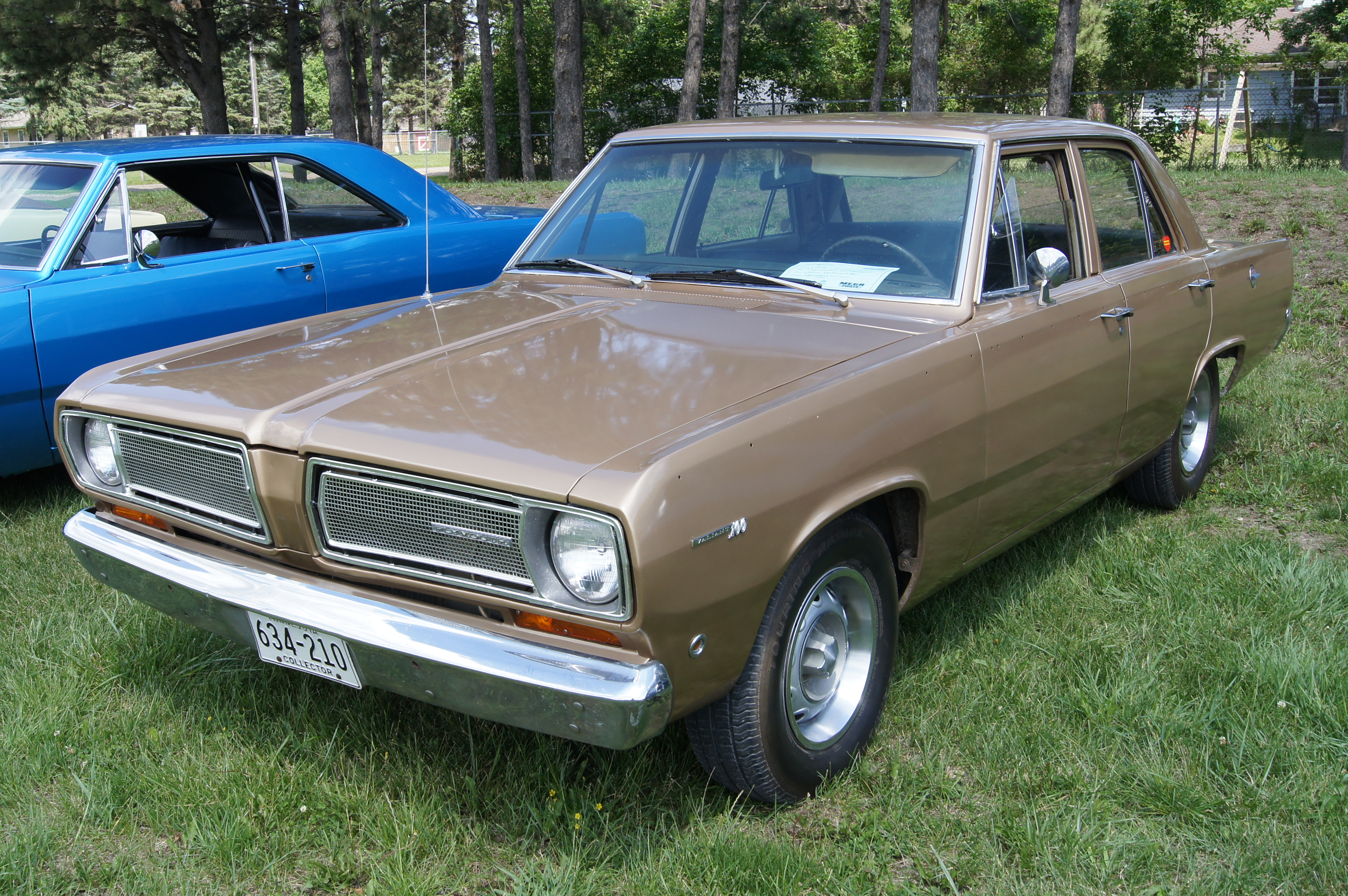
- 1968 Plymouth Valiant 100 4 door sedan

Overview
- Production: 1966–1973
- Model years: 1967–1973
- Assembly: United States: Hamtramck, Michigan (Dodge Main Factory); Belvidere, Illinois (Belvidere Assembly Plant); Maywood, California (Los Angeles Assembly); Newark, Delaware (Newark Assembly); Fenton, Missouri (Saint Louis Assembly); Mexico: Mexico City (Lago Alberto Assembly); Sweden: Nyköping (Saab-ANA); Switzerland: Schinznach (AMAG)

Body and chassis
- Body style: 4-door sedan (1967–1973); 2-door sedan (1967–1969); 2-door hardtop (1971–1973)
- Related: Dodge Dart; Dodge Demon; Plymouth Barracuda; Plymouth Duster; Chrysler Valiant; Chrysler Valiant Charger

Powertrain
- Engine: 170 cu in (2.8 L) LG Slant-6 I6; 198 cu in (3.2 L) RG Slant-6 I6; 225 cu in (3.7 L) RG Slant-6 I6; 273 cu in (4.5 L) LA V8; 318 cu in (5.2 L) LA V8

Dimensions
- Wheelbase: 108.0 in (2,743 mm); Scamp: 111.0 in (2,819 mm)

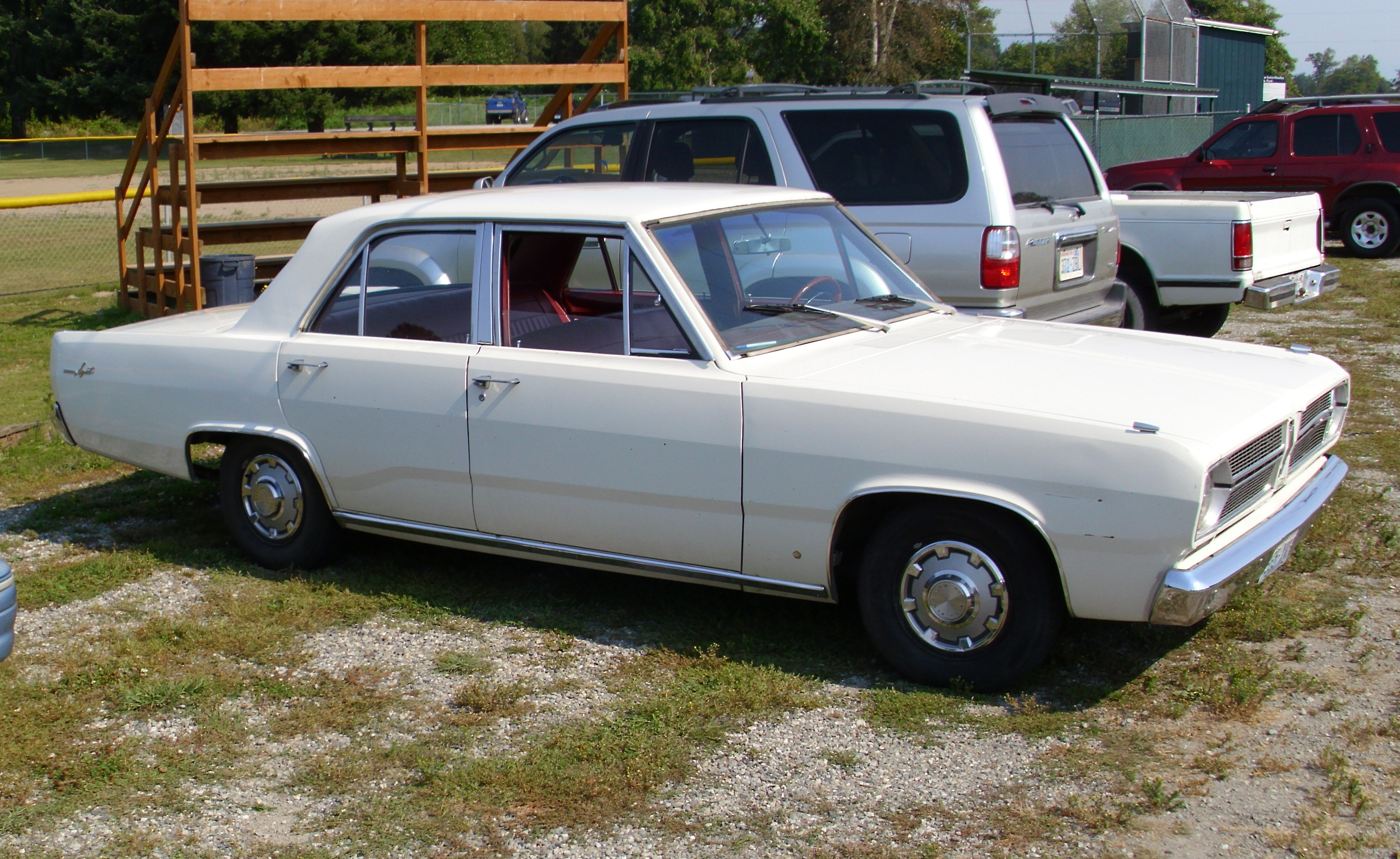
1967 Plymouth Valiant Signet 4-door Sedan

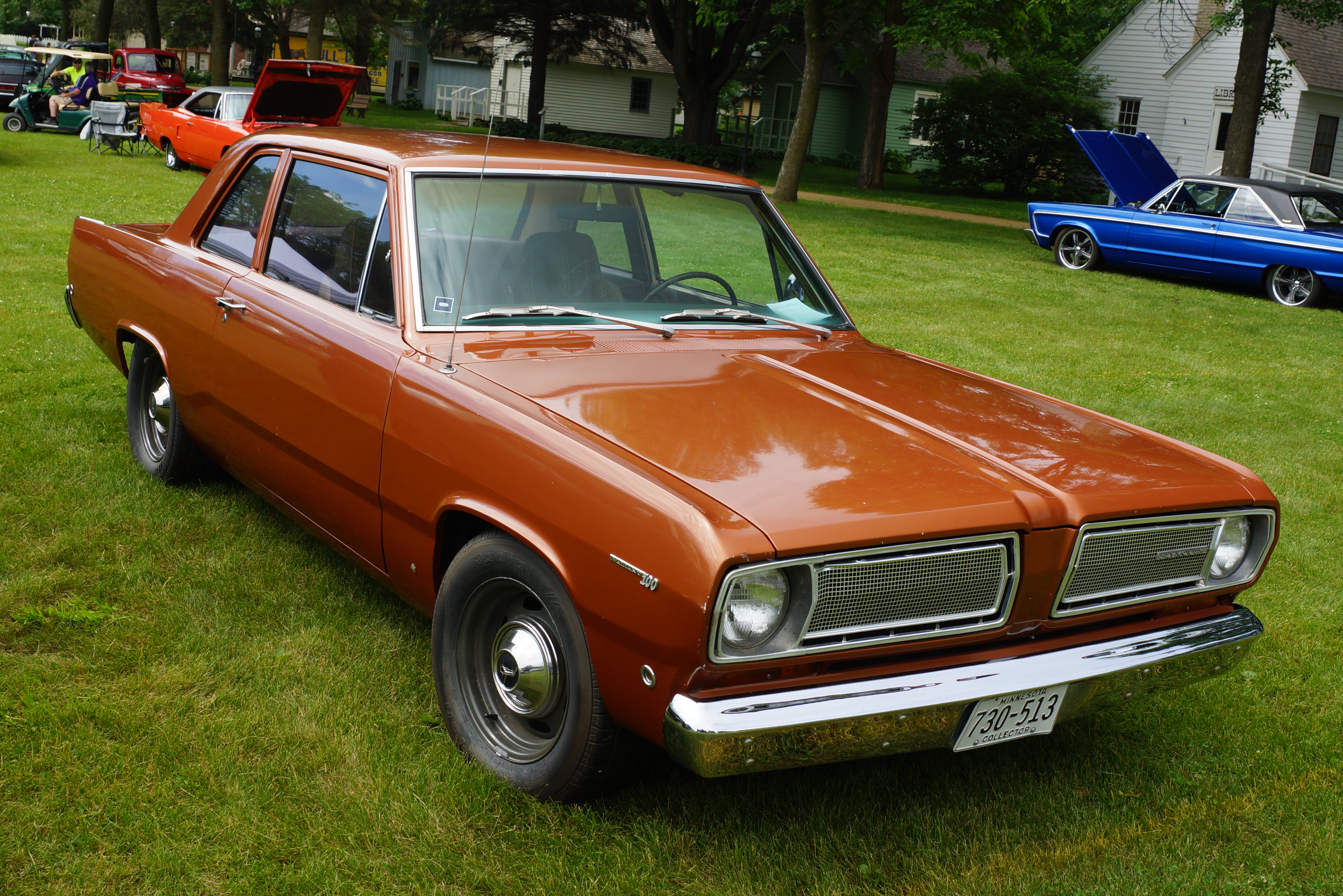
1968 Plymouth Valiant 2-door sedan

The Valiant was completely redesigned for 1967 model year and the station wagons, hardtops, and convertibles were dropped. Buyers who wanted a Valiant-type hardtop coupe or convertible could choose a similarly styled Barracuda, which was still based on the Valiant with a slightly sportier style. The new Valiant model range included two- and four-door sedans on a newly lengthened 108 in (2,700 mm) wheelbase. The design was straightforward and rectilinear. The body sides were mildly sculptured with a tapering lower feature line that widened toward the wheels. The new fenders had a vertical slab look. The grille was vertically split and subdivided horizontally. Vertical taillights were segmented and had a fanned-out look. Horsepower rating for the 170 cu in (2.8 L) Slant-6 engine was raised from 101 bhp (75 kW) to 115 bhp (86 kW) by installation of the slightly bigger camshaft introduced on the 225 in 1965, together with Carter BBS and Holley 1920 carburetors using the larger 1 11/16 in (43 mm) throttle bore previously reserved for the 225, rather than the smaller 1 9/16 in (40 mm) carburetors formerly used on the 170 engine. Federally-mandated safety equipment was provided on all 1967s, including a new dual-chamber brake master cylinder, energy-absorbing steering column, wheel, and instrument panel controls; shoulder belt mountings for outboard front passengers, a new 4-way hazard flasher, and, for 1970, lane-change directional signals were included.

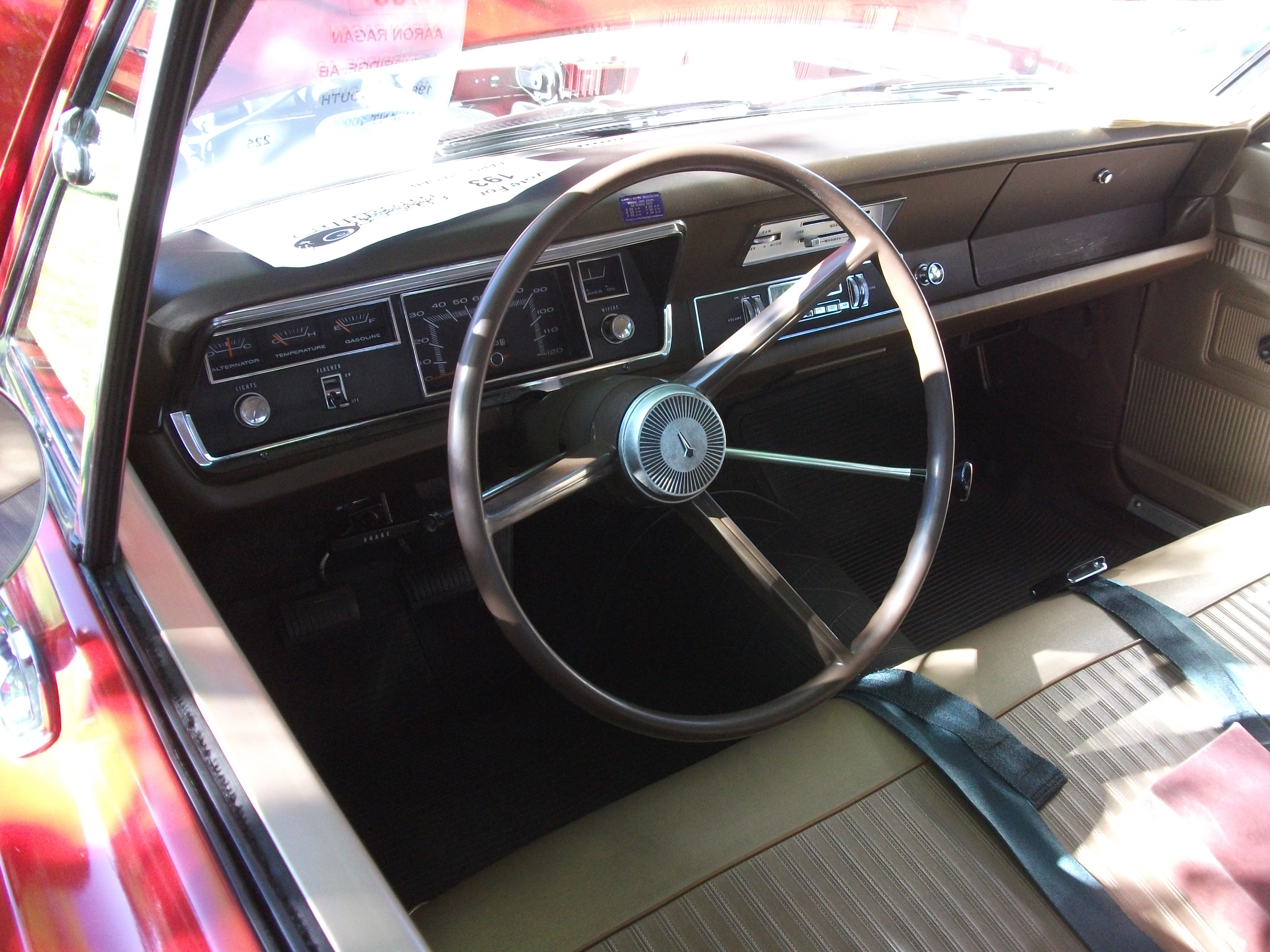
1968 Plymouth Valiant interior

For the 1968 model, the horizontal division bar was removed from the grille. A fine cross hatched insert was framed by a segmented chrome surround. Model nameplates were moved from the rear fender to the front fender. The 318 cu in (5.2 L), 230 bhp (170 kW) V8 was a Valiant option for the first time. All North American Chrysler products got front and rear side marker lights, amber in front, red in the rear. These were round in shape, surrounded by an attractive chrome bezel. Valiants built after January 1, 1968, also got new front shoulder belts as standard.

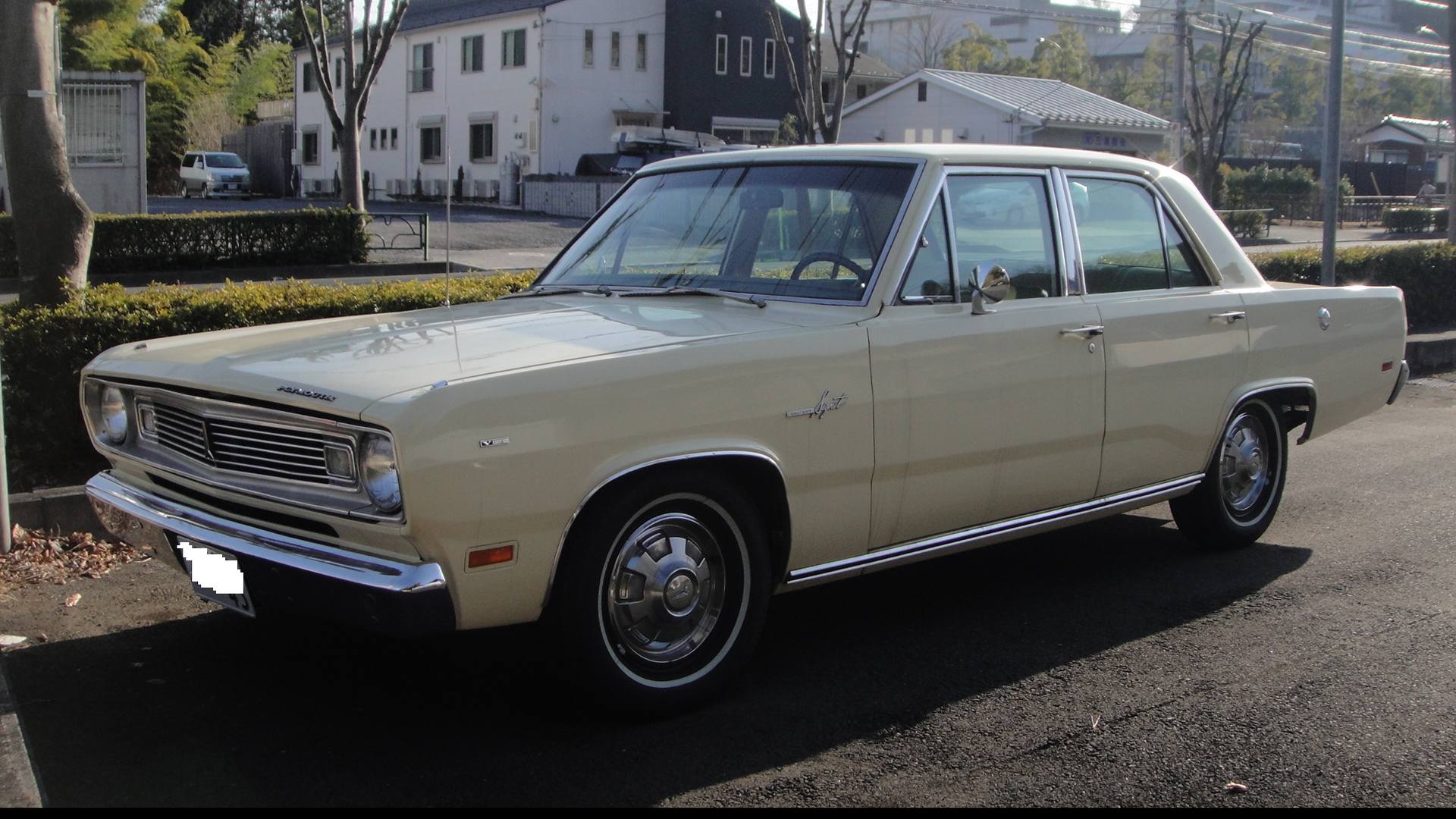
1969 Plymouth Valiant Signet 4-door sedan

For 1969, a new one-piece, full-width grille, new taillights and trim were featured. Standard engines were unchanged, although refinements in the Chrysler "clean air system" (formerly "clean air package") produced better operating economy from the six-cylinder engines. Improved drum brake self-adjusters, a more efficient power steering pump, and improvements to the optional Sure-Grip differential were also highlighted. Starting with cars built on January 1, 1969, front seat headrests were now standard. 1969 Valiants got new rectangular side marker lamps with federally required integral reflectors.

For 1970, the Valiant was carried over with detail changes, including a new black plastic grille sculptured differently from 1969's metal item. The central portion protruded flush with the forward edge of the hood, while the remainder of the grille was set back from the front plane. The two-door sedan was dropped, replaced by the new Duster coupe (see below). For all except export Valiants, the base 170 engine was replaced by a new 198 cu in (3.2 L) version of the slant-six. The 198 gave better performance than the 170, and was less costly to make, since it used the same cylinder block as the 225. The Valiant was virtually unchanged for 1971; small revisions included removal of the center grille emblem and a new kind of finish treatment on the grille surround. It now had a blacked-out look instead of the previous argent silver treatment. For the 1970 and 1971 models, exterior and interior trim were slightly revised, and there were engineering changes for better driveability, improved soundproofing and decreased emissions, the latter in compliance with regulations mandated by the newly created Environmental Protection Agency (EPA) implementing new devices such as an EGR valve and an activated charcoal evaporative emissions system. The 1971 Valiant eventually set sales records with 256,930 calendar year deliveries, so there was little motivation to change it for 1972. Only details of the taillights and grille were altered for the 1972 Valiants. New surface-mount sidemarker lamp-reflector units replaced the more costly previous flush-mount items.

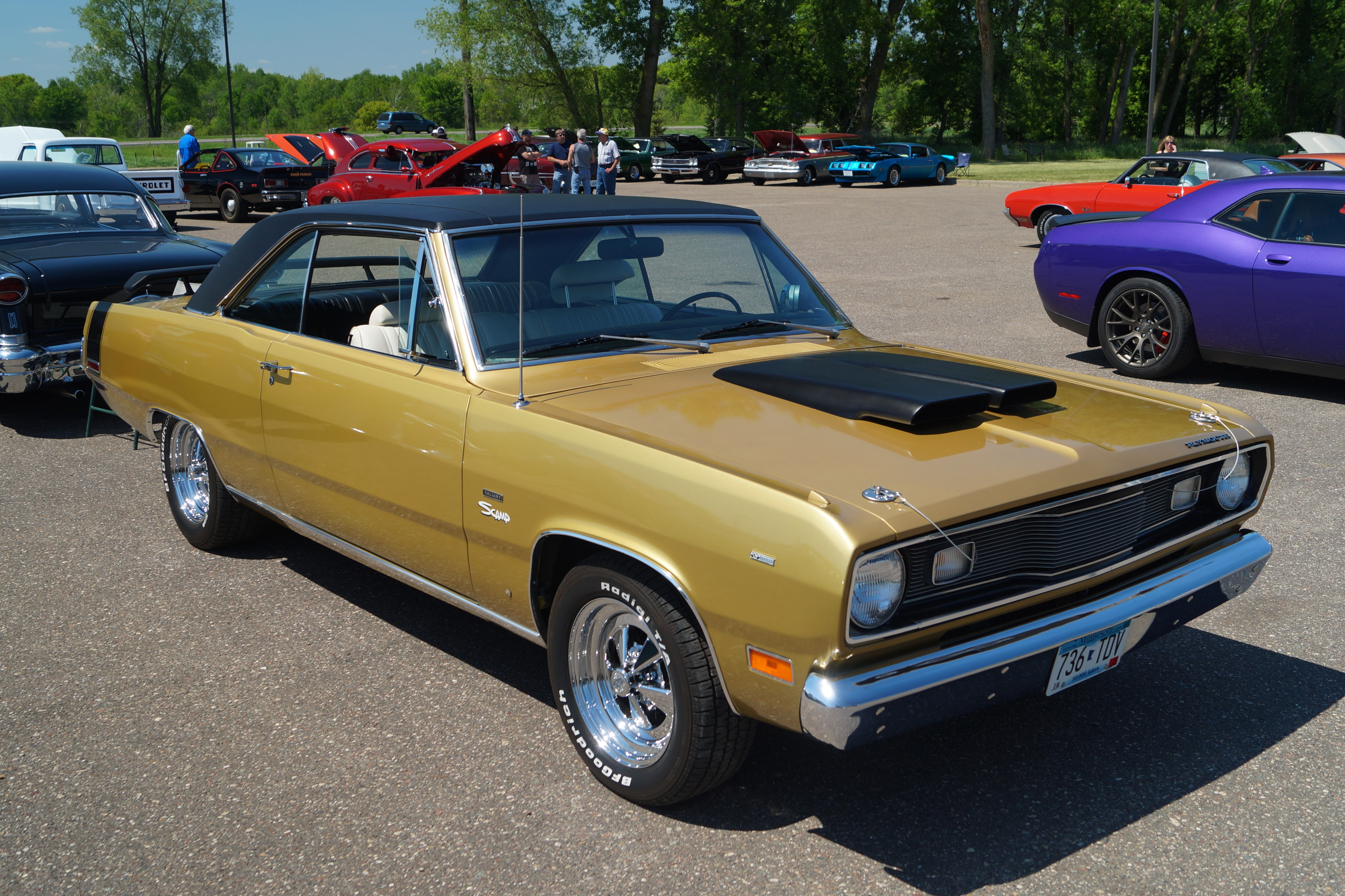
1971 Plymouth Valiant Scamp

Beginning in 1971, a badge-engineered version of the 111 in (2,800 mm) wheelbase Dodge Dart Swinger called the "Valiant Scamp" was offered. This used the Dart Swinger two-door hardtop body shell with Valiant front sheet metal and dual taillamps carried over from the 1970 Dodge Dart.

The year 1972 saw the Valiant's best sales ever, with 330,373 sold.

For 1973, the vent wing windows were deleted from the Scamp, and all models were given a new grille and front bumpers able to withstand damage at a 5 mph (8.0 km/h) impact, as well as steel beams inside the doors to protect vehicle occupants in side-impact collisions as mandated by NHTSA. The door beams, the new bumpers and their impact-absorbing mounts, a rubber-booted telescoping system attached to the car's structure, added mass to the Valiant. At the same time, engines were being progressively detuned to comply with increasingly stringent emissions regulations. Performance and economy suffered as a result.

Through the early 1970s, the Valiant took more than 40% of Plymouth's total sales volume. These models also had considerable success in foreign markets. Worldwide, Chrysler affiliates and subsidiaries sold American- or Canadian-made Valiants from complete knock down kits.

== Fourth generation (1974–1976) ==
Fourth generation
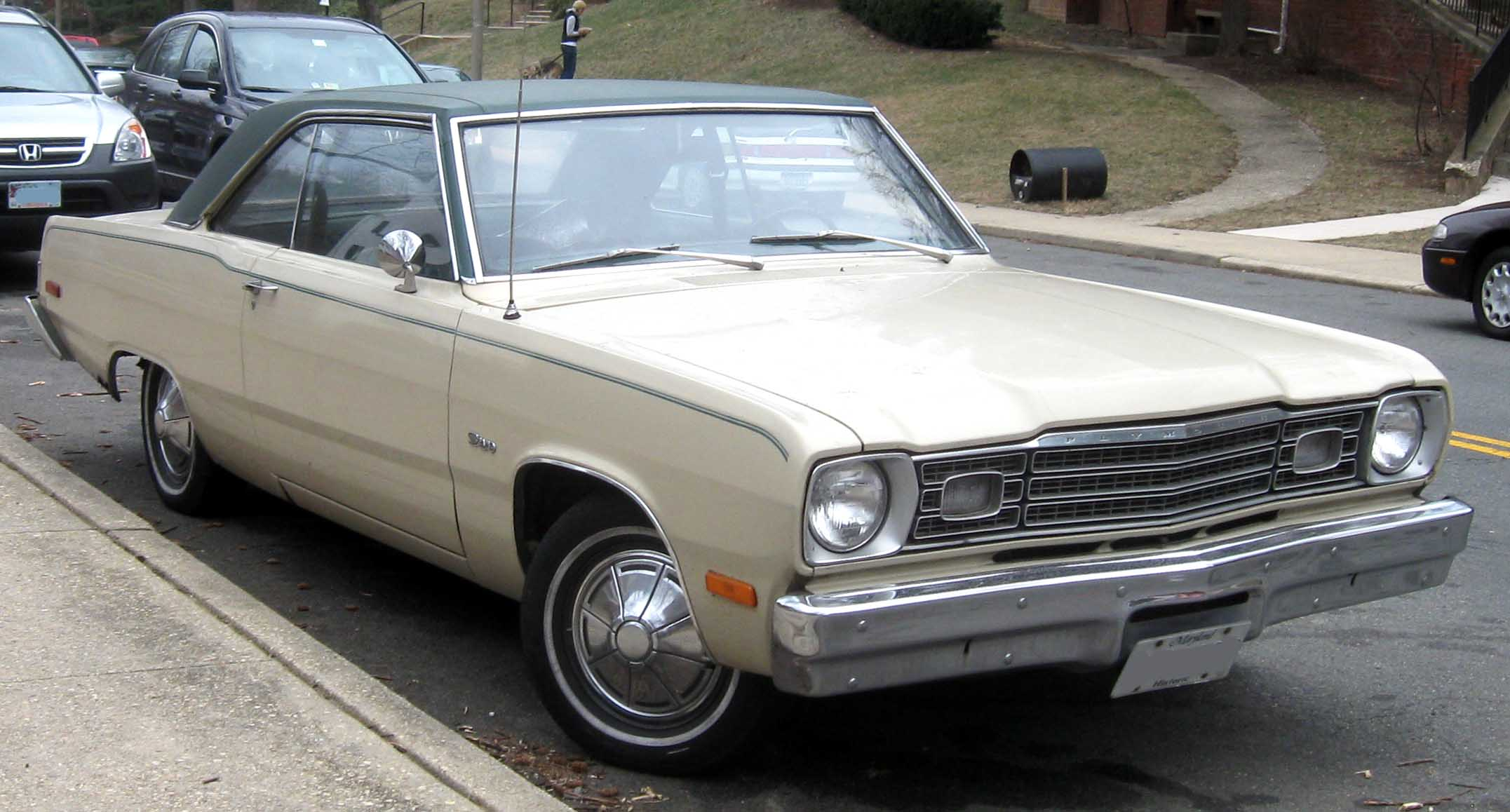

Overview
- Production: 1973–1976
- Model years: 1974–1976
- Assembly: United States: Hamtramck, Michigan (Dodge Main Factory); Belvidere, Illinois (Belvidere Assembly Plant); Detroit, Michigan (Lynch Road Assembly); Newark, Delaware (Newark Assembly); Fenton, Missouri (Saint Louis Assembly); Mexico: Mexico City (Lago Alberto Assembly); Sweden: Nyköping (Saab-ANA: until 1974)

Body and chassis
- Body style: 4-door sedan 2-door hardtop
- Related: Dodge Dart; Plymouth Duster; Chrysler Valiant; Chrysler Valiant Charger

Powertrain
- Engine: 198 cu in (3.2 L) RG Slant-6 I6; 225 cu in (3.7 L) RG Slant-6 I6; 318 cu in (5.2 L) LA V8; 360 cu in (5.9 L) LA V8

Dimensions
- Wheelbase: 111 in (2,819.4 mm)

In 1974, the 108 in (2,700 mm) wheelbase variant of the A-body sedan was dropped, and the Valiant sedan became a rebadged Dart. The larger size resulted in thicker C-pillars and new rear fender contours. Thenceforth, the only differences between the Valiant and Dart were minor cosmetics. The 1973 Valiant grille and front sheet metal were retained for 1974, but the front bumper's rubber guards were chromed. The taillights were extensively redesigned, resulting in a more formal look. The US federal 5 mph (8.0 km/h) bumper standards were applied to rear bumpers for the 1974 models, adding even more weight to the Valiant. Since the Duster (1970), Dart-based Scamp (1971) and Dart-based sedan (1974) displaced both of the Valiant's 1967 bodies, they could be considered to represent a fourth generation of Valiants.

1974 Valiant was also available in a "Scamp package" which included 318 V8 engine, two door, three-speed automatic transmission, power steering, power disc brakes, chrome trim, vinyl roof, AC, carpet, split vinyl bucket seat bench, radio, rear window defroster blower, and 120 mph speedometer standard. Production was limited and ordered as customers requested the package, a few hundred were produced.

1974 introduced the Valiant Brougham and its twin, the Dodge Dart special edition. Available in two- or four-door models, they were a compact luxury car meant as an attractive alternative to larger luxury cars following the 1973 oil crisis. The Brougham had generous chrome trim, a vinyl top, deep cut-pile carpeting, velour cloth upholstery, interior door padding, color-keyed or simulated wire wheel covers, and a special selection of paint and trim combinations. Much of the optional equipment on a regular Valiant became standard equipment on Brougham models such as power steering, power disc brakes, air conditioning, cruise control, electric rear window defroster and an AM/FM radio.

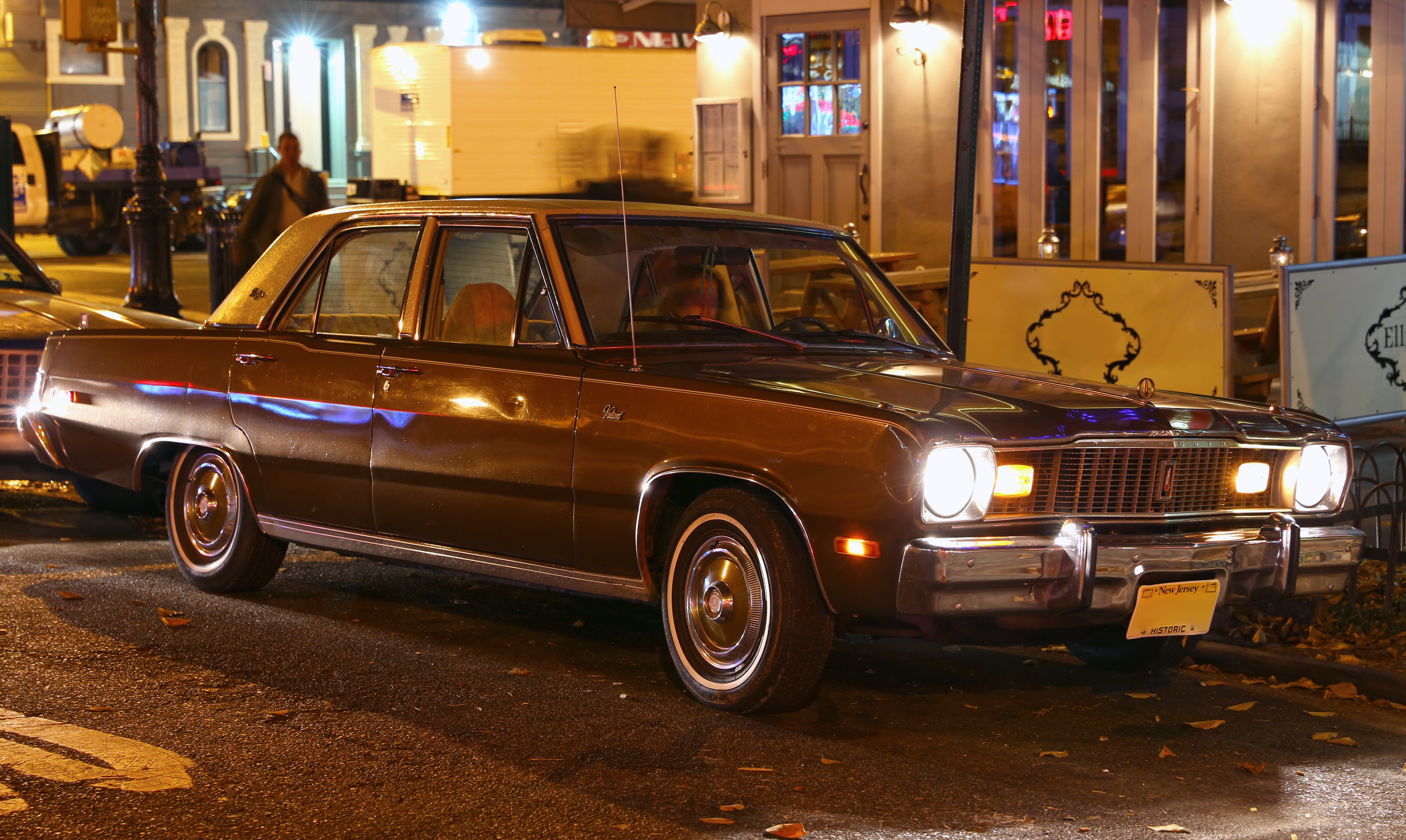
1975 Plymouth Valiant Brougham, the most luxurious Valiant available

With a slightly restyled grille, 1975 models were essentially carry-overs from 1974 except that California and certain high-altitude models received catalytic converters and required unleaded gasoline. The 1975 Valiants had several new items available to buyers with increasing interest in fuel economy. These included radial tires and a "Fuel Pacer" system that lit a warning light to tell the driver he was driving uneconomically, as well as Chrysler's A833OD four-speed manual transmission, the first four-speed Chrysler had offered with a six-cylinder engine in the North American market since 1965. There were new 50,000 mi (80,000 km) spark plugs and batteries and a "clincher" warranty that covered everything on the car except trim for 12 months with no mileage restrictions.

1976 models were virtually identical to 1975s; amber rather than clear front park/turn signal lights were used and the parking brake pull-handle was changed to a foot pedal.

Production figures 1974

Make and Series	L-6	V-8	Total
Valiant	85,463	26,866	112,329
Duster	181,926	65,045	246,971
Scamp	32,126	13,693	45,819
Duster 360	0	3,969	3,969
Brougham	4,098	12,213	16,311
Sum	303,613	121,786	425,399

=== A38 police package ===
In 1976, the Valiant was available as a Code A38 police package car and offered in three basic engine sizes: E24 (California emission standards) and E25 (federal) 225 cu in (3.7 L) single-barrel slant-six; E44 318 cu in (5.2 L), twin-barrel V-8; E58 360 cu in (5.9 L), four-barrel V-8 with single (California) or dual (federal) exhaust. It was the E58 that Chrysler recommended for police service as it was the only one with "added endurance features to improve durability". The E58 produced 175 net hp in California trim and 220 net hp in federal form. The E58 dual exhaust engine (sans catalytic converters) made for a very fast Valiant squad car. So equipped, this compact Chrysler cop car tripped the quarter-mile lights in 16.4 seconds with trap speeds of 84.6 mph (136.2 km/h) and could catch nearly all the so-called "performance cars" of the day. The Seattle Police Department using the Valiant A38 reported a 46 percent drop in the preventable accident rate among police officers and according to a Motor Trend police survey, the A38 Valiant had much better evasive capabilities, better overall visibility, and was generally easier to drive than the full-size squad cars. A special handling package applied to the A38 Valiant included front and rear antisway bars. However, the Valiant was not physically durable enough; it lacked additional frame welds and rear cross-member reinforcements standard on all other Mopar A38 packages. More importantly, the front K-frame of the Valiant was prone to failure under severe police use.

=== Replacement with Plymouth Volaré and Dodge Aspen ===
In 1976, the Plymouth Volaré and Dodge Aspen F-body cars were introduced mid-year replacing the Valiant and Dart, respectively. Production of the A-body shifted to Saint Louis Assembly while Hamtramck Assembly was dedicated to the new F-body, which did not maintain their predecessors' reputation for quality and durability and in fact reversed it. The change hurt Chrysler's reputation and profitability, contributing to its near-bankruptcy in 1979–80.

== Derivative models ==
=== Barracuda ===
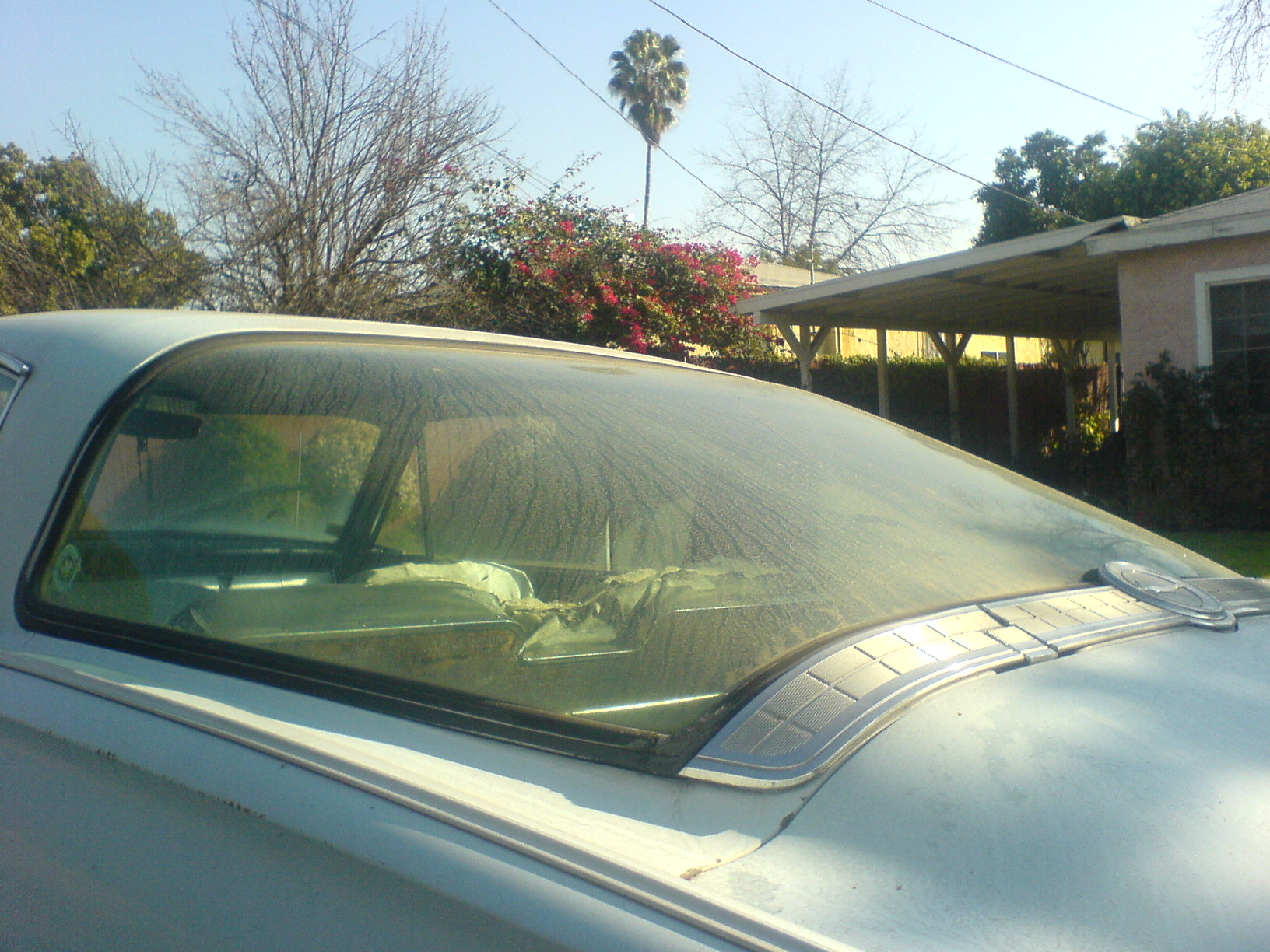
1966 Barracuda rear window and fish badge

Automotive trends in the early middle 1960s had all the US automakers looking at making compact sporty cars. The Valiant was a natural choice of basis for Chrysler's efforts in this direction. Ford's Mustang gave this type of vehicle its common "pony car" moniker, but in fact Chrysler beat Ford to market by two weeks with the April 1, 1964 release of the Barracuda fastback. The Barracuda used the Valiant's 106 in (2,700 mm) wheelbase and the Valiant hood, headlamp bezels, windshield, vent windows, quarter panels and bumpers; all other sheet metal and glass was new. This hybrid design approach significantly reduced the development and tooling cost and time for the new model. Unfortunately, the Barracuda was as similar to the Valiant as the Mustang was different from the Falcon, and its introduction was, at first, barely noticed by most buyers.

The fastback body shape was achieved primarily with an enormous rear window, or backlight, which wrapped down to the fenderline. Pittsburgh Plate Glass (PPG) collaborated with Chrysler designers in producing this 14.4 ft^{2} (1.34 m^{2}) rear window, the largest ever installed on a standard production car up to that time. The following year, the fenders and taillamps that had been introduced on the 1964 Barracuda were used on the whole 1965 Valiant range except for the wagon, which got different taillamps.

The second-generation Barracuda, though still a 106 in (2,700 mm) wheelbase A-body sharing many components with the Valiant, was given Barracuda-specific styling and its own range of models including convertibles and fastback and notchback hardtops. A wide range of engines were available on the Barracuda throughout its production lifecycle, from a 145-hp 225 cubic-inch (3.7L) slant six, up through high-compression small- and big-block V8s.

Although the first and second generation Barracudas were heavily based on the contemporary Valiants, Plymouth wanted them perceived as a distinct models. Consequently, the "Valiant" chrome script that appeared on the 1964 model's trunk lid was deleted on the 1965 model in the US market. For 1966, the stylized red-and-blue Valiant "V" emblems were replaced on the Barracuda with a model-specific stylized fish logo. For 1967, the new four-barrel 383 cu in (6.3 L) V-8 with 280 hp (210 kW) was optional only in the Formula S, which boosted the Barracuda's performance with 0–60 mph in 7.4 seconds and the quarter mile covered in 15.9 seconds. In other markets such as Canada and South Africa, where Valiant was a marque in its own right, the car remained known as the "Valiant Barracuda" until the A-body Barracuda was discontinued after 1969.

For 1970, the Barracuda lost all commonality with the Valiant as an all-new E-body Barracuda was produced.

=== Duster ===
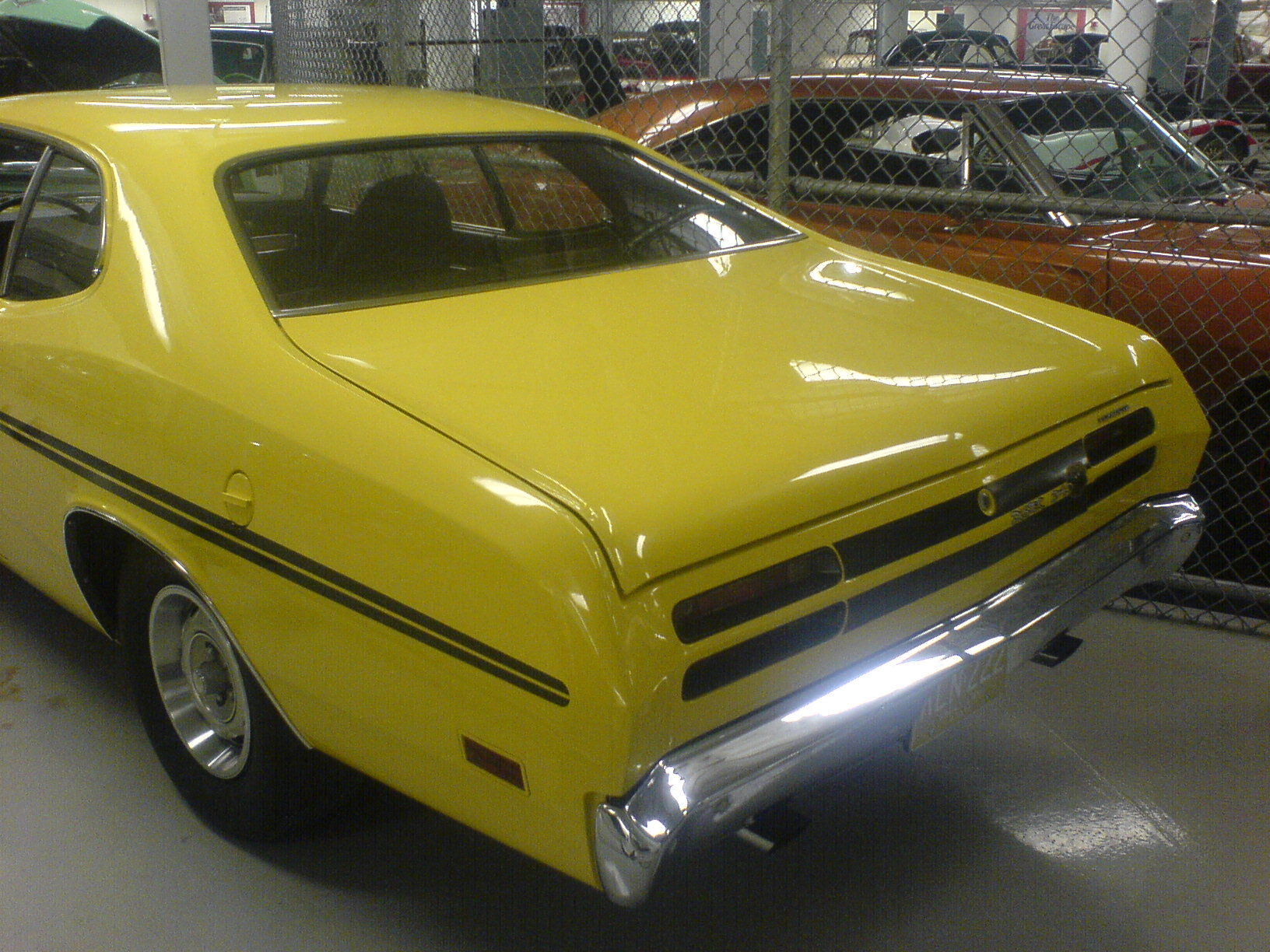
1970 Duster 340 with logo

Plymouth introduced a sporty new model for 1970: the two-door fastback Duster. The same technique that spawned the 1964 Barracuda was employed for the Duster. It was designed to use the same front end sheet metal, running gear, and 108 in (2,700 mm) wheelbase as the Valiant, but Plymouth's stylists gave the car an entirely new look by using a modified fastback configuration with radically curved side glass having only half the curvature radius of conventional side glass. Though the 340 cu in (5.6 L) V8 engine with 10.5:1 compression, 275 bhp (205 kW) and 340 lb⋅ft (461 N⋅m) of torque had been available for special order in Valiants and Barracudas since 1968, the 340 was offered as a regular production option in the Duster 340, Plymouth's analogue to the Dodge Demon 340 and the Dodge Dart Swinger 340. The Duster was an immediate hit as a sporty alternative to the now larger and more expensive Barracuda. Throughout its production lifetime, the vast majority of Dusters were built with the Slant Six engine (available in 198 and 225 cubic inch versions) and TorqueFlite automatic transmission.

An aggressive "shark tooth" grille was offered on the fastback Duster 340 and new-for-1971 Duster Twister models. The Twister was a "performance appearance package" produced in response to increasing premiums on muscle cars, many of which were calculated using the vehicle's power-to-weight ratio as an actuarial gauge. Despite the "dust whirl" side stripes and "Twister" decals, Rallye road wheels, dual racing mirrors, twin hood scoops, flat-black hood paint with strobe stripes, and plaid cloth-and-vinyl trim interior available in four colors, the biggest engine available was the 318 cu in (5.2 L) V8.

Chrysler increased the displacement of its highest-performance small block V-8 engine from 340 cu in (5.6 L) to 360 cu in (5.9 L) for 1974. The 360 was rated at 245 hp (183 kW) and placed in the Duster 360. However, the 1974 Duster was nearly 150 lb (68 kg) heavier than the 1971 model on account of the heavier bumpers, side-impact door beams, emission control equipment, and added soundproofing. Even with performance options such as the four-speed manual transmission, Hurst shifter and Sure-Grip differential with 3.55:1 axle ratio, 0–60 mph and quarter-mile times increased roughly two seconds compared to those for the 1970 Duster. However, higher fuel prices and performance-car insurance surcharges deterred many buyers as the interest in high performance waned.

== International variants ==
=== Argentina (1962–1968) ===
In 1962, Chrysler-Fevre Argentina S.A. started building the 1960 version of the US Plymouth Valiant under the Chrysler nameplate (although later most of the cars were sold under the "Valiant" nameplate as an independent brand). Only the four-door version was produced. Two models were offered, the "Valiant V200" (Valiant I), with a 2,790 cc engine, and, since 1963, the "Valiant II" with a 3,687 cc engine. In 1965 the "Valiant III" was launched. Despite its name, this car was similar to the 1963 US Dodge Dart. It was offered in three trims, standard, Coronado (luxury) and GT (sport). In 1967 the "Valiant IV" came out. This car also looked very much like the US 1966 Dodge Dart, offering the same trims than the previous version. Production ceased for the Valiants in 1968, when they were replaced by the GTX /Coronado/Polara lineup. However, for the 1968 model year a basic "Valiant" trim of the Coronado/Polara was offered.

=== Australia (1962–1981) ===
The Valiant was introduced in Australia in 1962, as a right-hand drive version of the American 1961 model; just over 1,000 of these were sold before they were superseded by a locally adapted version of the US 1962 model. As in other markets outside the United States, they were sold not as Plymouths but as Chryslers, replacing the previous Chrysler Royal range. The AP5 model, introduced for 1963, was built locally by Chrysler Australia—the first of eleven Valiant model ranges built until 1981. Australian models were locally assembled and marketed as the Chrysler Valiant. These models incorporated a mix of North American and local design and components. The third-generation U.S Valiant was marketed locally from 1966-1970 as the Chrysler Valiant VC, VE, VF and VG. Australia exported their Valiant models to other right-hand-drive markets in Southeast Asia and the Pacific and eventually to South Africa in Knock-down kit form. Fully assembled models were exported to the United Kingdom, albeit in small numbers. Assembly of Australian Valiants commenced in New Zealand from 1964.

From 1971, U.S and Australian engineers deviated fully from the United States models and developed an Australia-only range. Still marketed as a Chrysler Valiant the new all-Australian Chrysler Valiant (VH) model bore no resemblance to the U.S Valiant and remained largely unchanged until end of production in 1981.

The coupe utility or "ute" (car-based pickup truck), the Valiant Charger coupe, and the Chrysler by Chrysler luxury car were all Valiant-based models unique to Australia.

Chrysler Australia was eventually bought out by Mitsubishi Motors Australia and the last Australian Valiants were produced by Mitsubishi from 1980 to 1981.

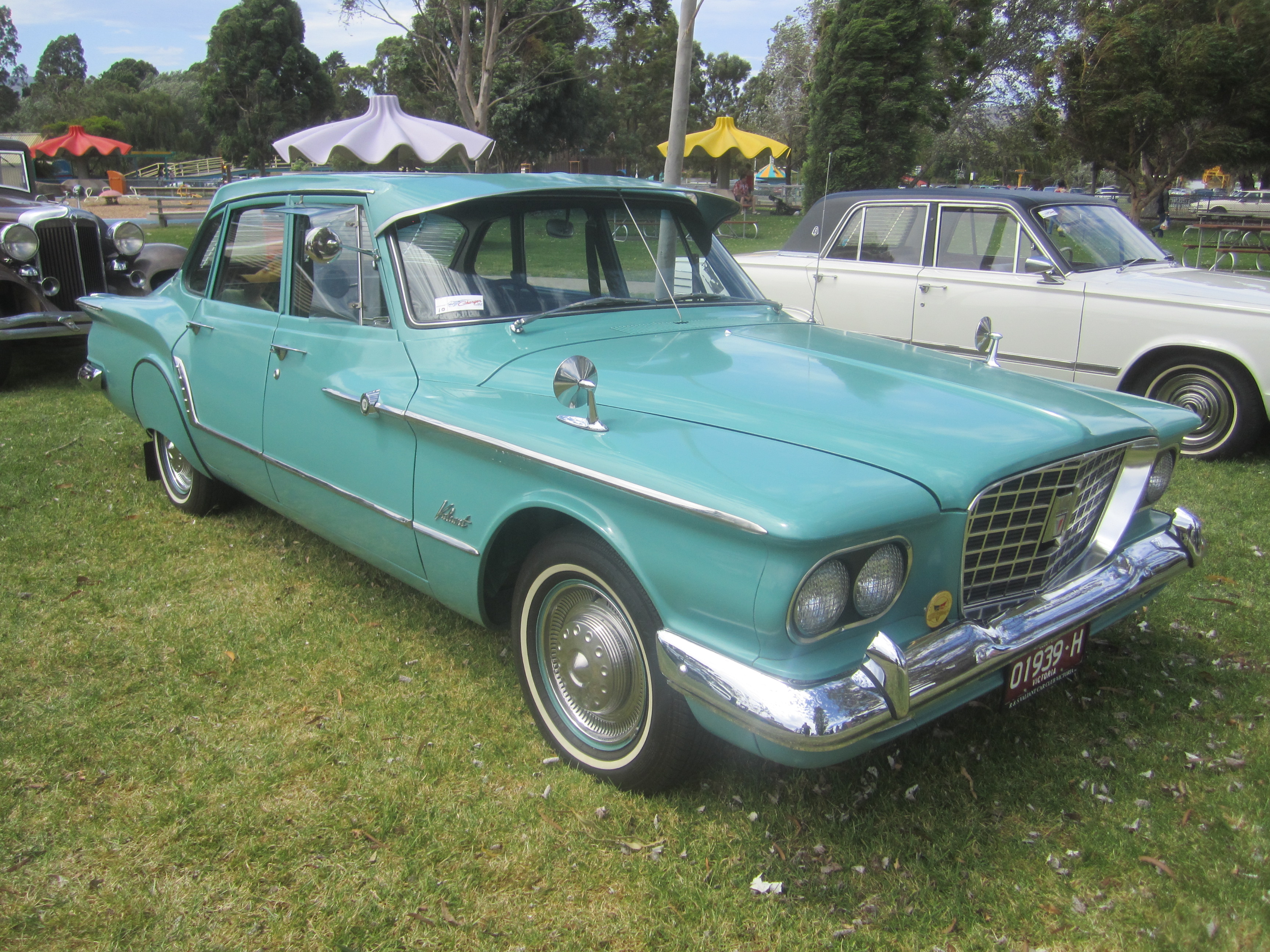
The first 1962 Australian RV1-model was a right-hand–drive version of the 1961 US Plymouth Valiant.

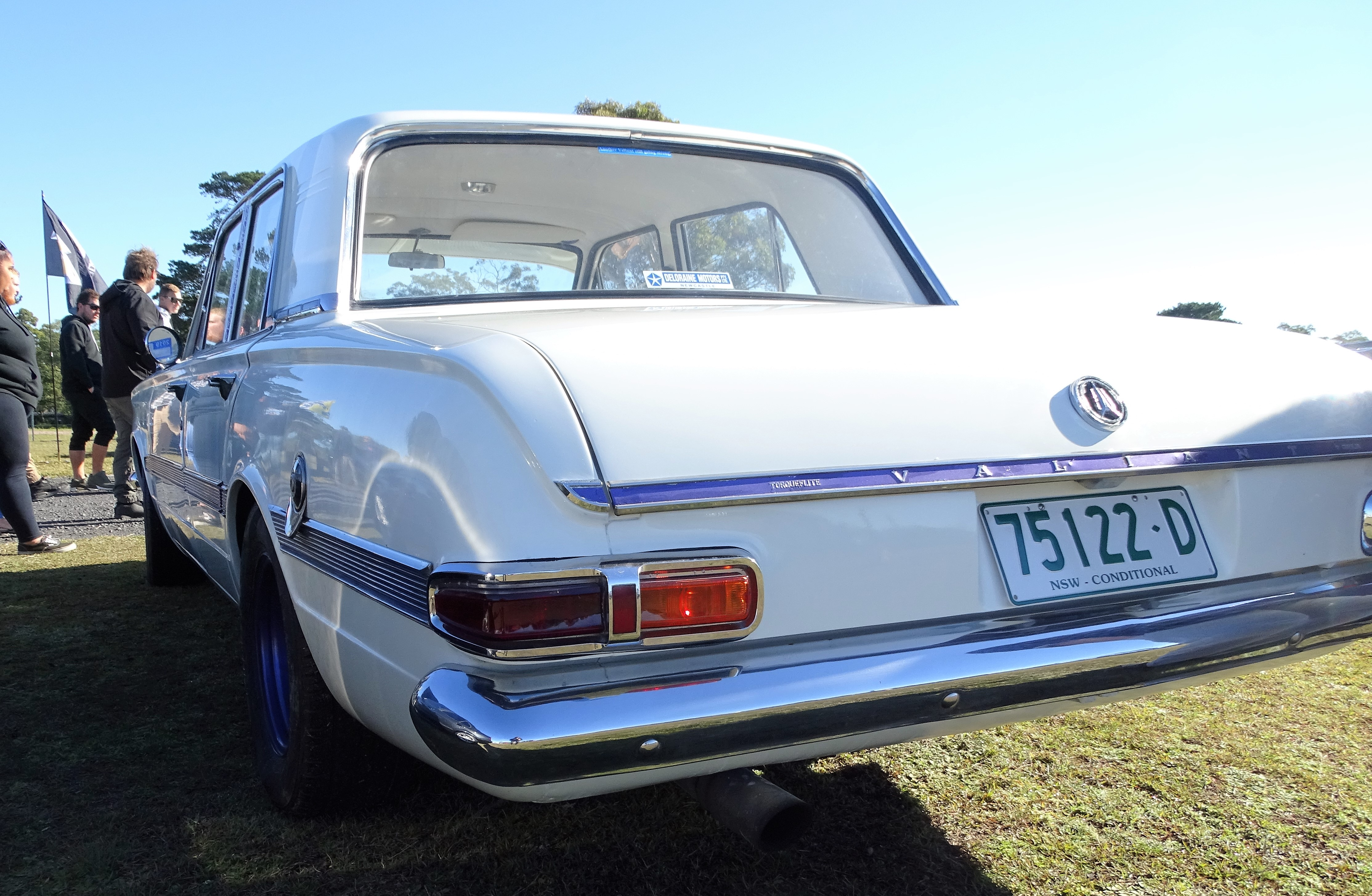
1965 Australian AP6-model Valiant

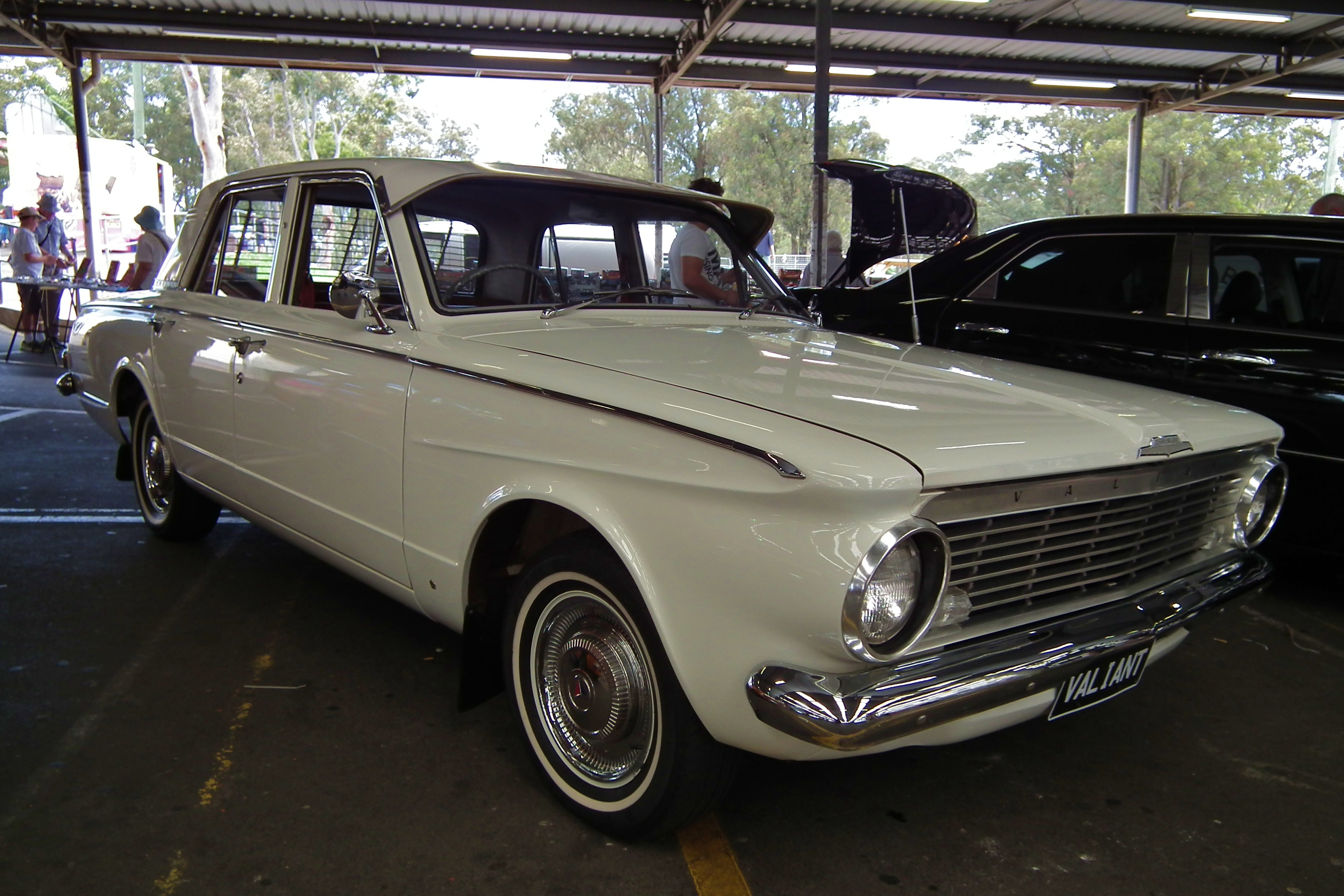
The 1963-'64 AP5-model Valiant used the same doors, windshield, and front fenders as the U.S. Valiant; everything else was Australian.

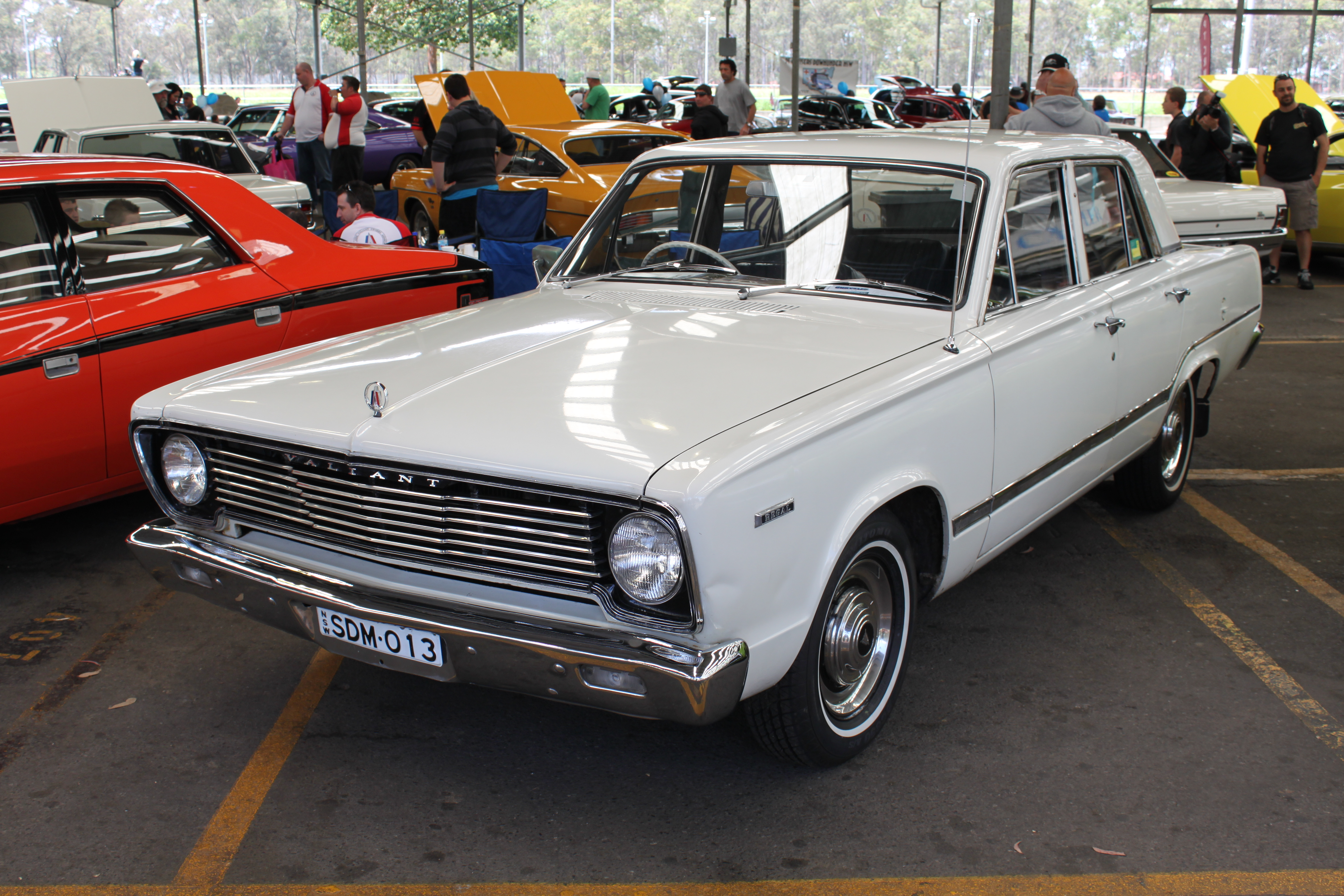
The 1966 Australian VC-model Valiant used the US doors, windshield, and front fenders, but departed further from American styling.

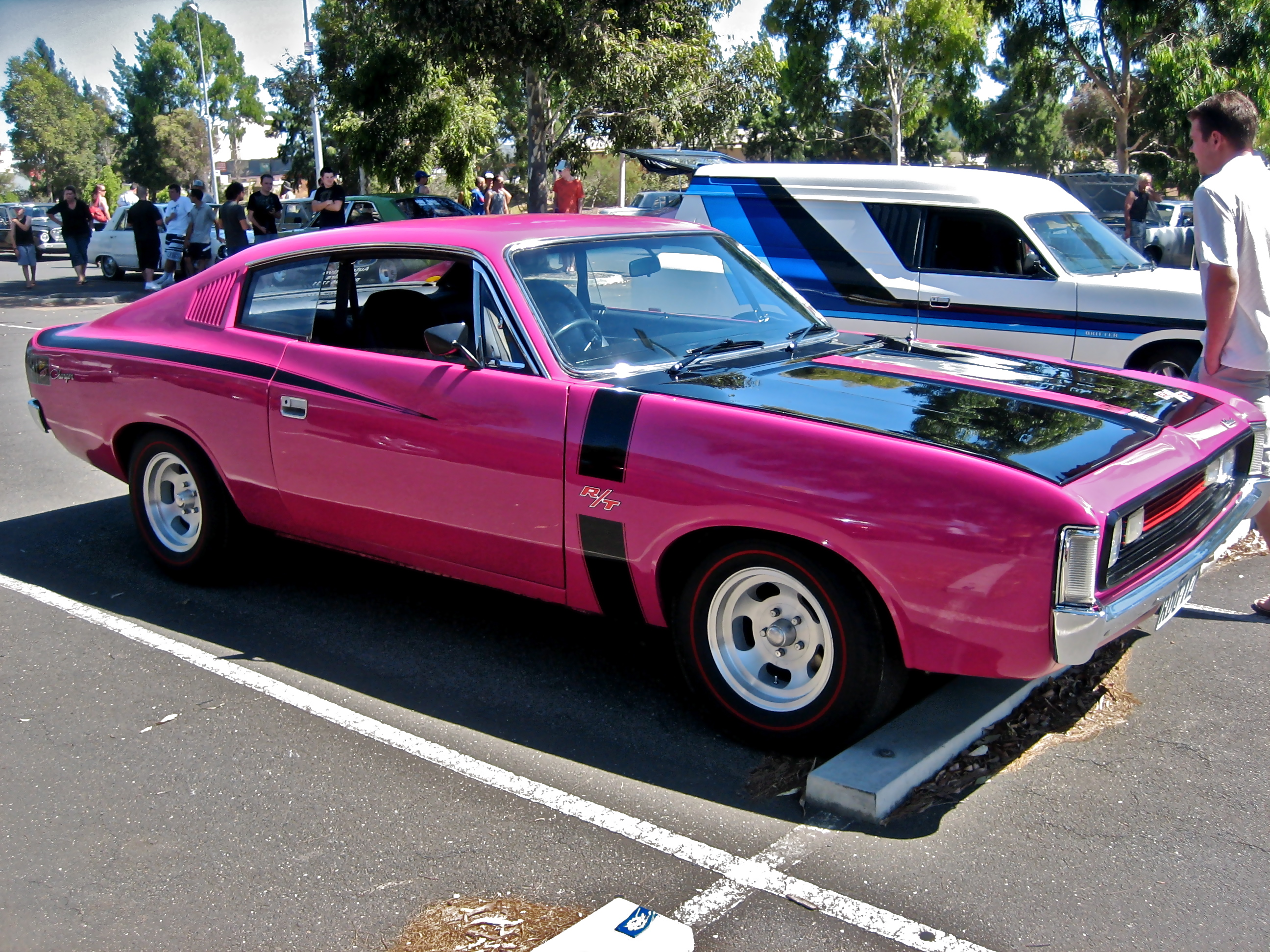
Australian 1971 VH Valiant Charger R/T

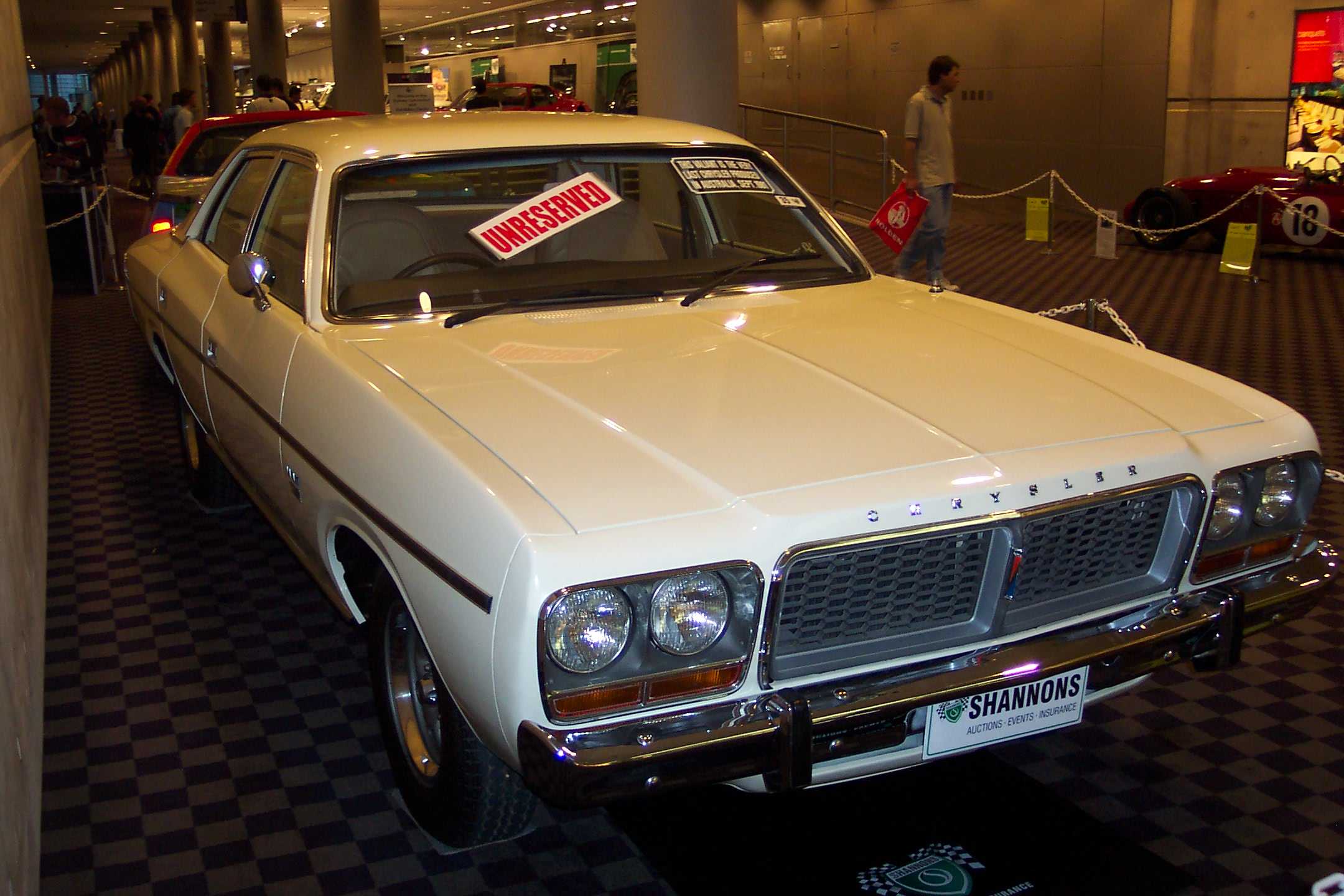
The last Australian Valiant, built 28 August 1981 after Chrysler Australia had been sold off to Mitsubishi

=== Canada (1960–1966) ===
Chrysler Canada marketed the Valiant at Dodge and Plymouth dealers under a standalone "Valiant" marque. The Canadian 1960–62 Valiant was visually similar to its American counterpart except the badge on the trunk lid read "by Chrysler" instead of "Plymouth". Besides minor differences in interior and exterior trim, the alternator was an extra-cost option in Canada through 1962 while it was standard equipment in America. An anti-ice system for the carburetor's throttle body, engine block heater, battery warmer, electric car interior heater and other cold-climate items were available as factory or dealer-installed options. Air conditioning, which was first offered in the US 1961 models, was not made available north of the border until 1966. Some Canadian-made Auto-Lite (now Prestolite) electrical components were used in lieu of the American-production Chrysler-built components. The Windsor, Ontario, plant was a source for left- and right-hand-drive export Valiants as knock down kits.

For 1963 and 1964, the Canadian Valiant used US Plymouth Valiant front sheet metal with the US Dodge Dart body and 111 in (2,800 mm) wheelbase (except wagons, which—like all 1963–1966 Dart and Valiant wagons—were on the 106 in (2,700 mm) wheelbase).

For 1965, Chrysler Canada sold both the 106 in (2,700 mm) wheelbase and the 111 in (2,800 mm) wheelbase A-body vehicles, all badged as Valiants, and all with the US Dart dashboard and instrument cluster. For 1966, the shorter Valiant was dropped from the Canadian market and all Canadian Valiants were now rebadged US Darts.

The Canadian Barracuda, badged as the "Valiant Barracuda", was built in Canada in 1964 and 1965 but was imported for 1966. Like the Valiant, the Barracuda had no Plymouth markings.

With the coming of the US-Canada Auto Pact of 1965, Chrysler could ship cars and parts both ways over the border and in 1967 the company began importing Plymouth Valiants and Dodge Darts from the US, as well as exporting Darts and Valiants from Windsor to the US.

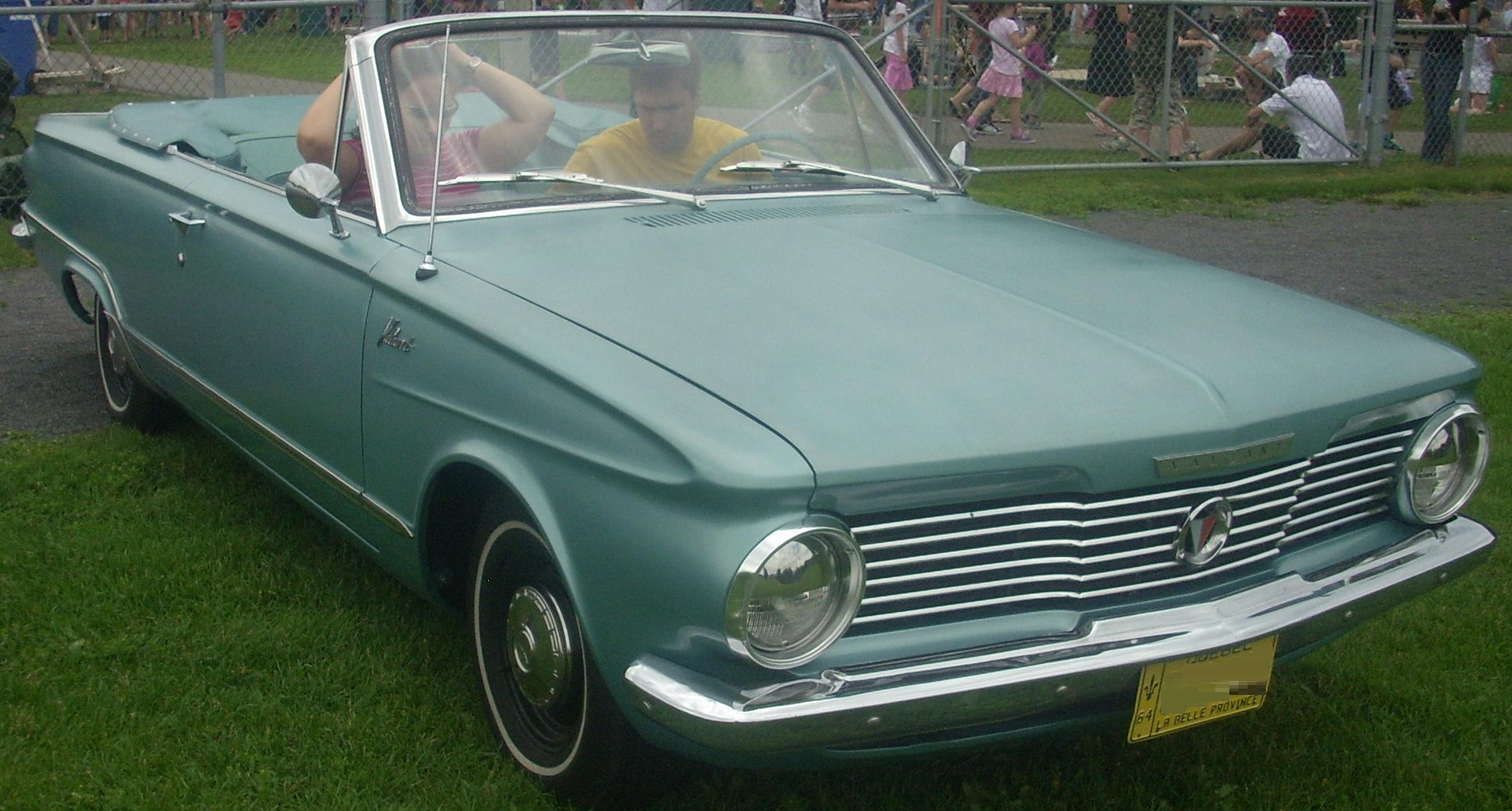
Canadian 1964 Valiant convertible, essentially a US Dodge Dart with a US Valiant front clip (hood, grille, headlights, etc.)

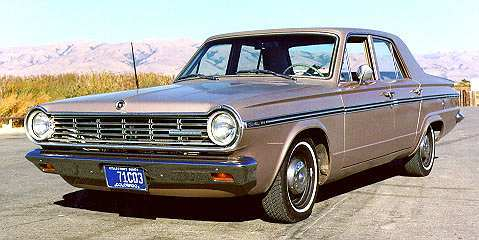
Canadian 1965 Valiant Custom 200, virtually identical to the US Dodge Dart.

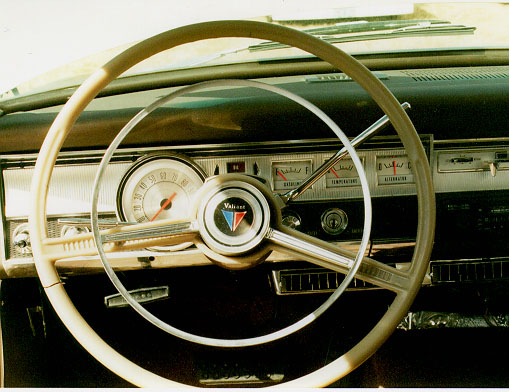
1965 Canadian Valiant Custom 200 dashboard, very similar to the Dart's.

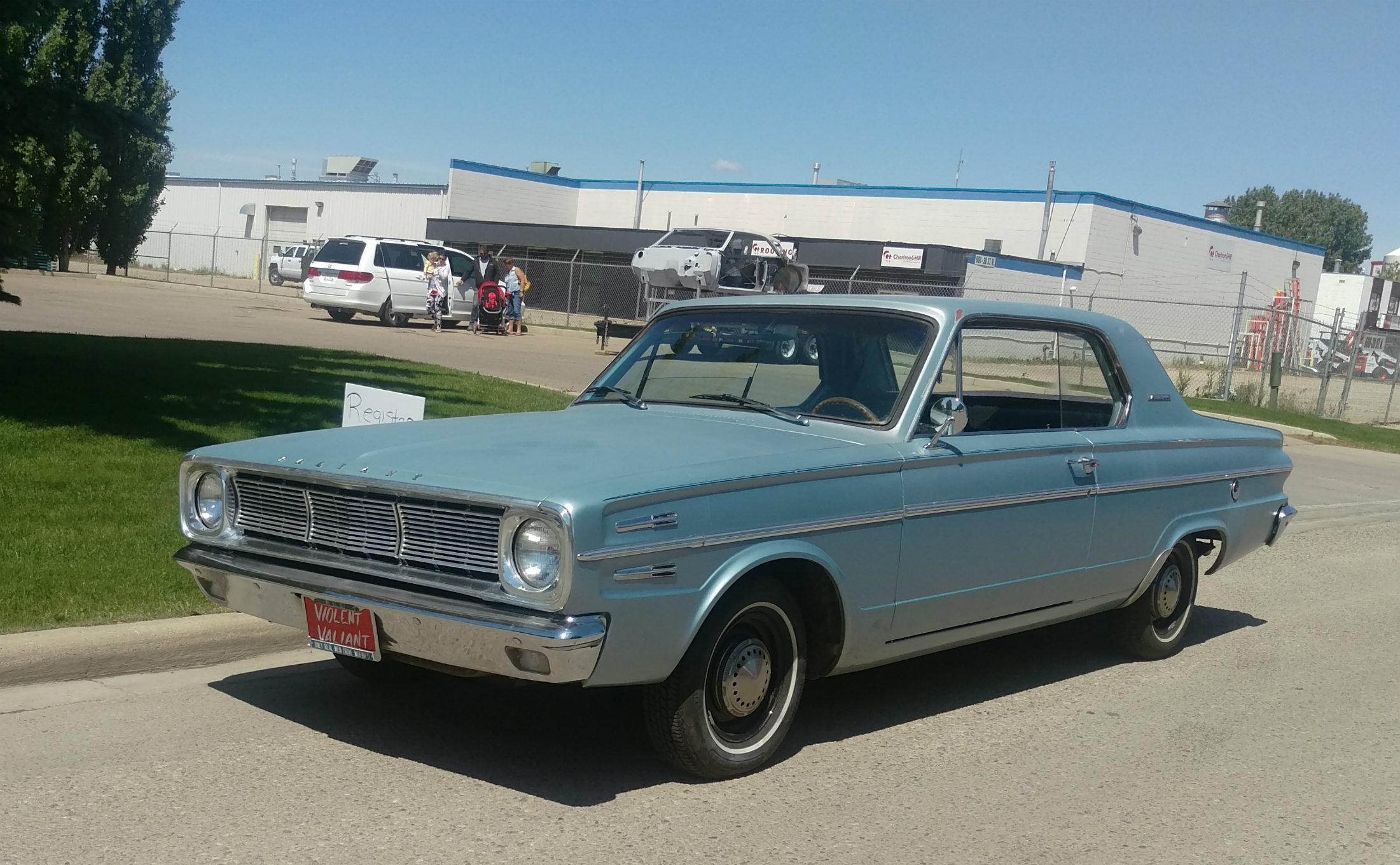
1966 Canadian Valiant Custom 200 2-door hardtop

=== Mexico (1963–1976) ===
Valiants, which were assembled and sold in Mexico from 1963 through 1976, were essentially the same A-body models as their US counterparts with minor differences. The Mexican Valiant lineup included a unique two-door hardtop produced from 1963 to 1969 called the "Acapulco" named after the coastal resort city. Based on a V200 Signet, the Acapulco was not available in the US or anywhere else outside of Mexico. Unique were the 1967-69 models, true 2 door hardtops; a body style not available in the U.S. The most notable features included a cobra snakeskin vinyl roof and emblems of Acapulco in the interior and on the trunk lid. Other features included bucket seats, upgraded interior and remote controlled passenger side mirrors. The car was powered by 2bbl 225 slant-six which was being used concurrently in the Australian market; the manual transmission was operated by a four-on-the-floor Hurst gearshift.

The Valiant Duster was introduced in Mexico in 1970, the same as the Plymouth Duster sold in the US market. Starting in 1972, the Valiant Duster got the same body as the US-market Dodge Demon/Dart Sport. In 1976, A-body cars were discontinued in North America, replaced by the Plymouth Volare/Dodge Aspen. Mexican Volares were badged as "Valiant Volares"; these vehicles had the Volare rear end but with the Aspen grille. When the Volare was replaced with the Reliant "K-cars" in 1981, these cars were marketed as "Valiant Volare Ks" as well. The Valiant Volare K, sold until 1988, was the last Valiant-badged car sold in Mexico.

=== Netherlands (1960–1962) ===
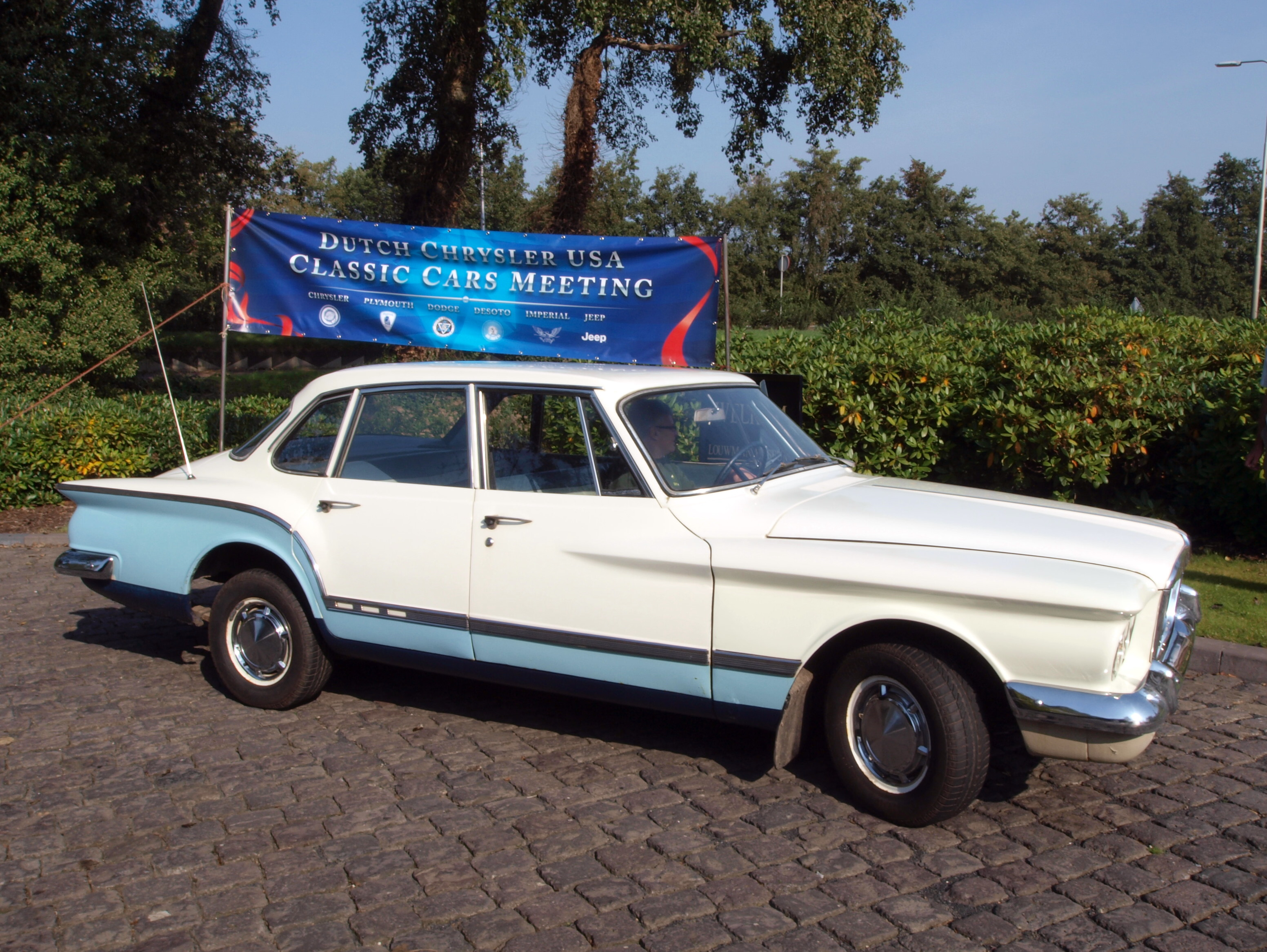
Plymouth Valiant assembled at Rotterdam, Netherlands

Valiants were assembled from Complete Knock-down kits at the former Nederlandse Kaiser Automobiel Fabriek (NEKAF) factory in Rotterdam, Netherlands. Kaiser-Frazer was liquidated at the end of 1958 and the assembly plant was taken over by Chrysler International S.A. Chrysler's existing assembly plant in Antwerp was closed and all production shifted to the ex-NEKAF plant. The plant went on to produce Valiant, Plymouth, Dodge, and Simca vehicles for the European market.

A snapshot of first-generation Valiant production by the plant reveals 772 Valiants produced in 1960, none in 1961, and 1032 Valiants produced in 1962.

=== New Zealand (1963–1981) ===
New Zealand's first Valiant model was the Australian 1963 Chrysler Valiant "S" series. New Zealand assembly of the Australian models began in 1964 by Todd Motors first in Petone, Wellington, and from 1974 in Porirua, Wellington. Only four-door sedans and utilities (pickups) were produced. Station wagons, coupes and the mid-70s upmarket Chrysler by Chrysler sedans were otherwise fully imported from Australia. The NZ-assembled Chryslers were generally identical to the Australian versions with a few variations. During the 1970s Valiants were assembled with 40% local content and unique specifications. For example, the New Zealand VJ Valiant Regal 770 was a combination of the body of the Australian VJ and front end of the Australian VH and CH Chrysler. New Zealand models featured different interior trim and stiffer suspension settings to cope with the sometimes winding, mountainous New Zealand roads.

Todd Motors also assembled the Australian two-door Valiant Charger 770 between 1971 and 1976. Latter Charger models were fully imported. Todd Motors ceased production in 1981.

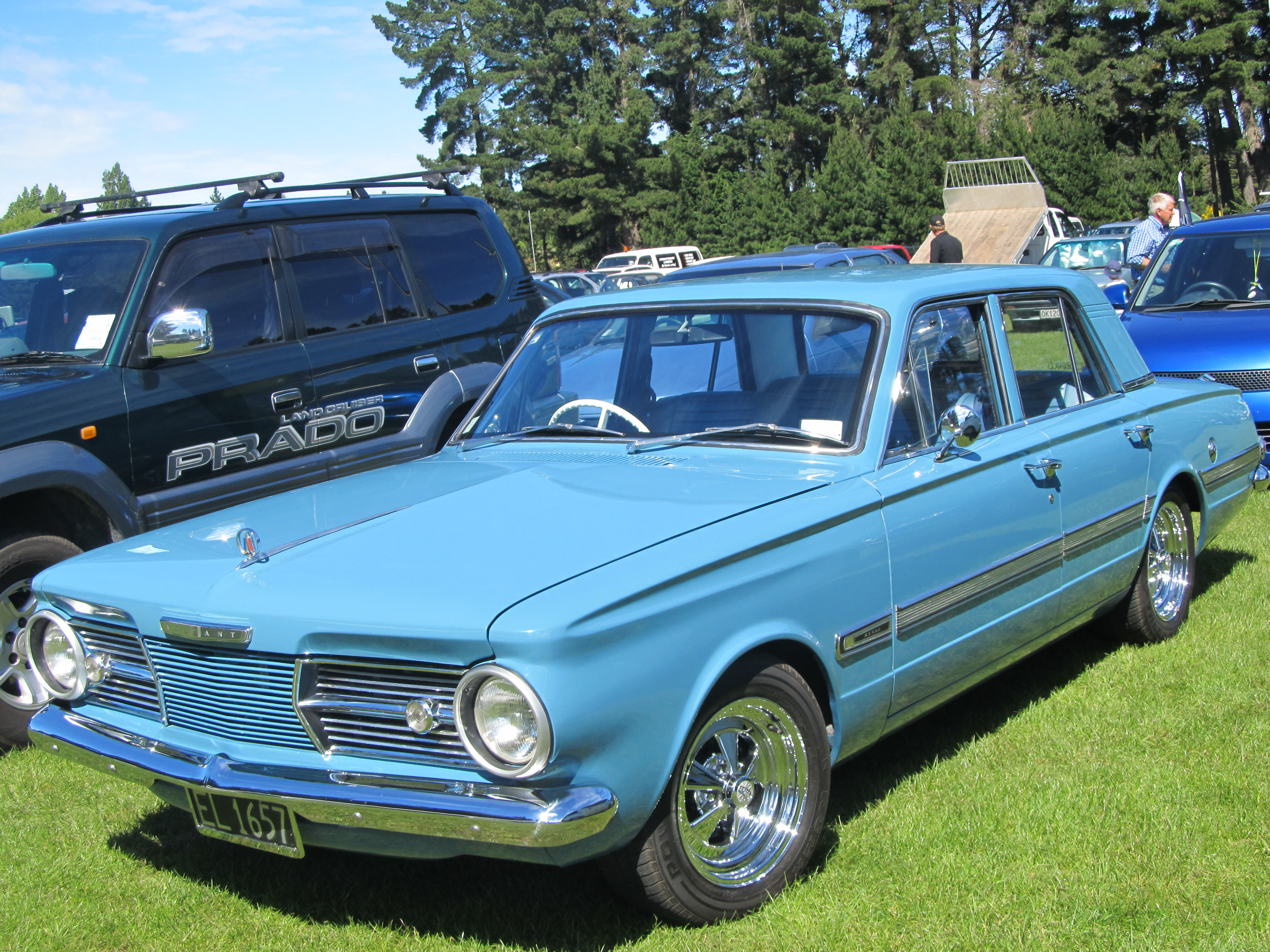
1966 Valiant AP6 (New Zealand)

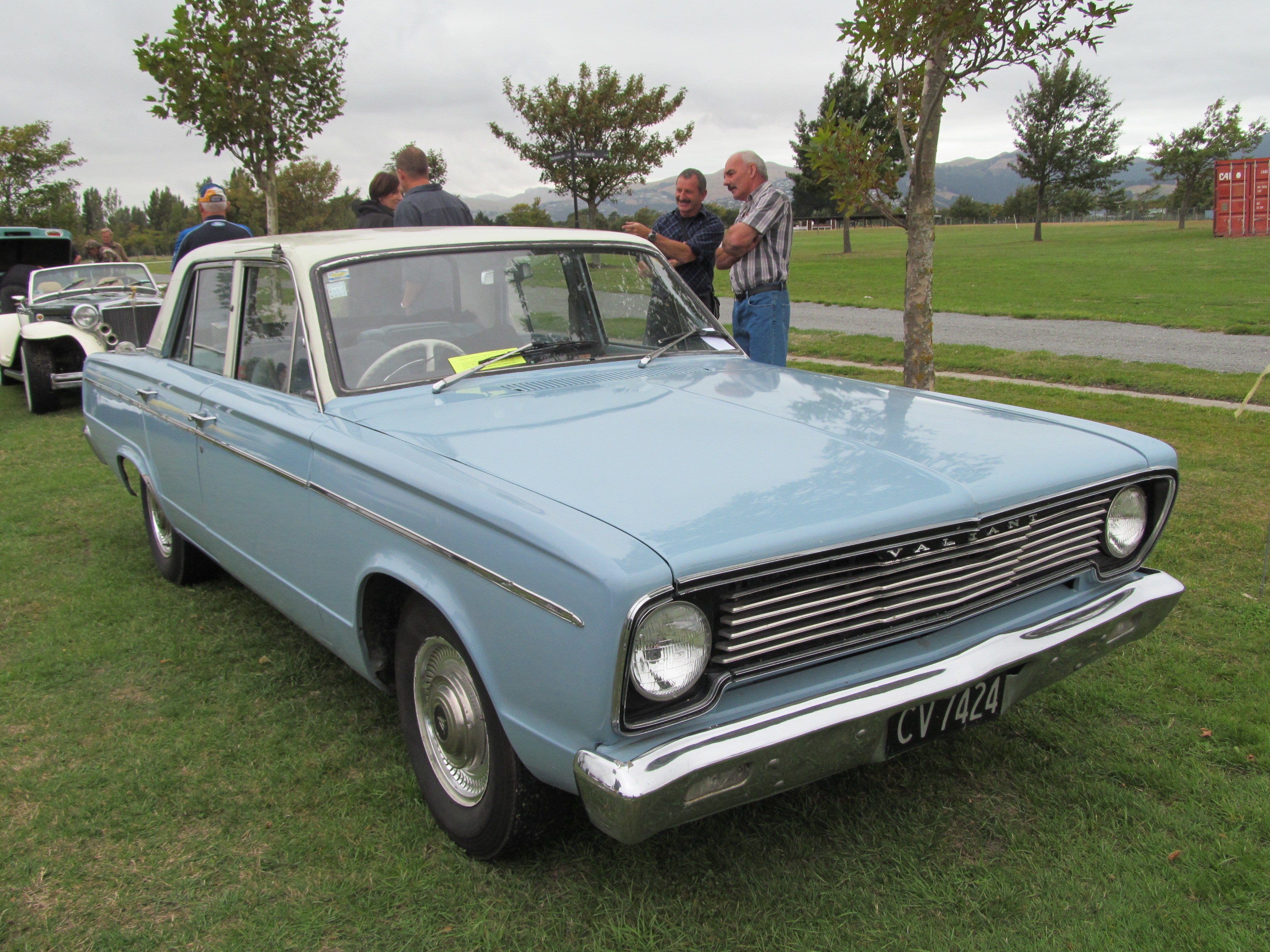
New Zealand assembled 1967 VC Chrysler Valiant (New Zealand)

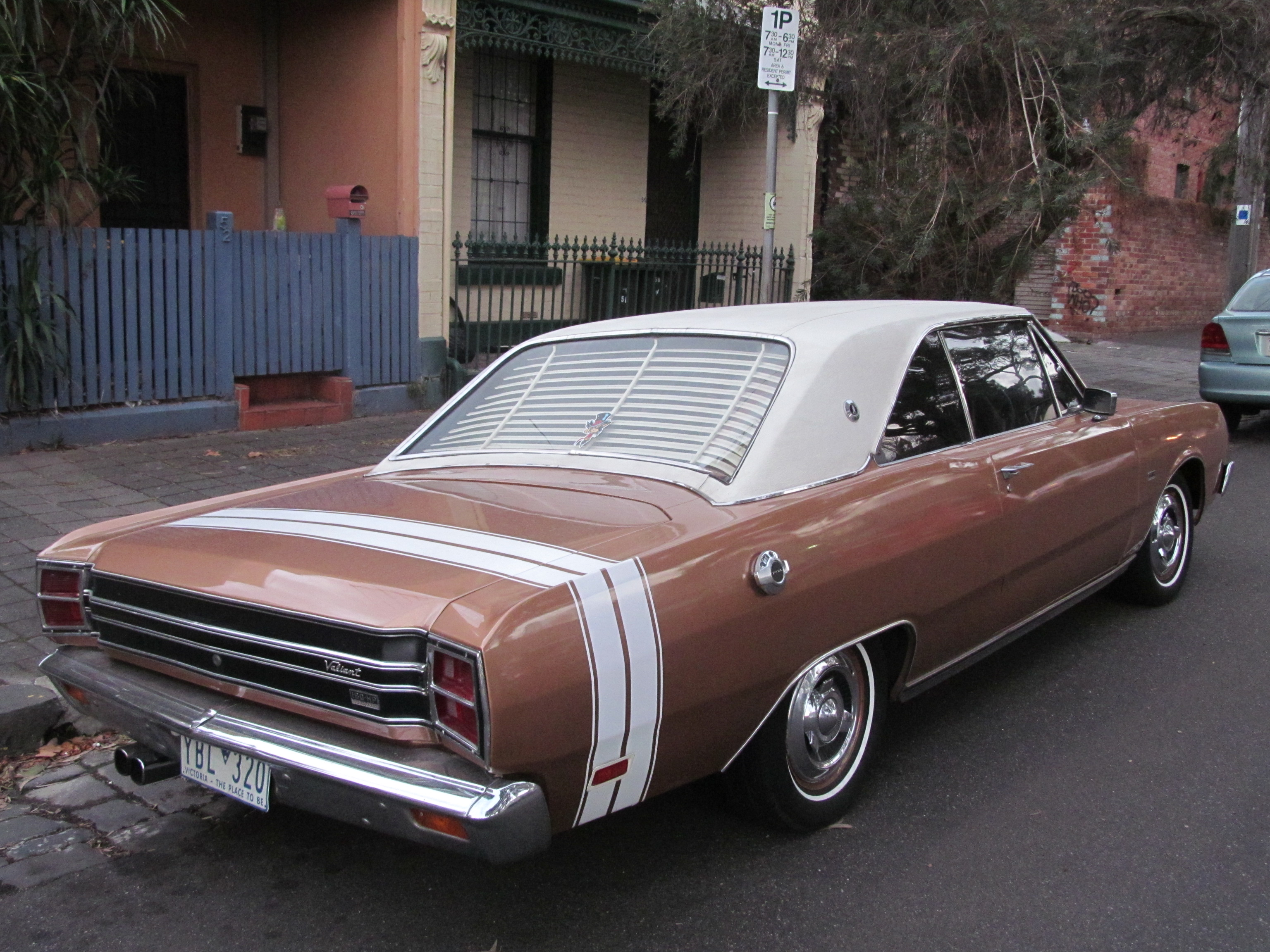
1970 Dodge Dart-based Valiant hardtop coupe (New Zealand)

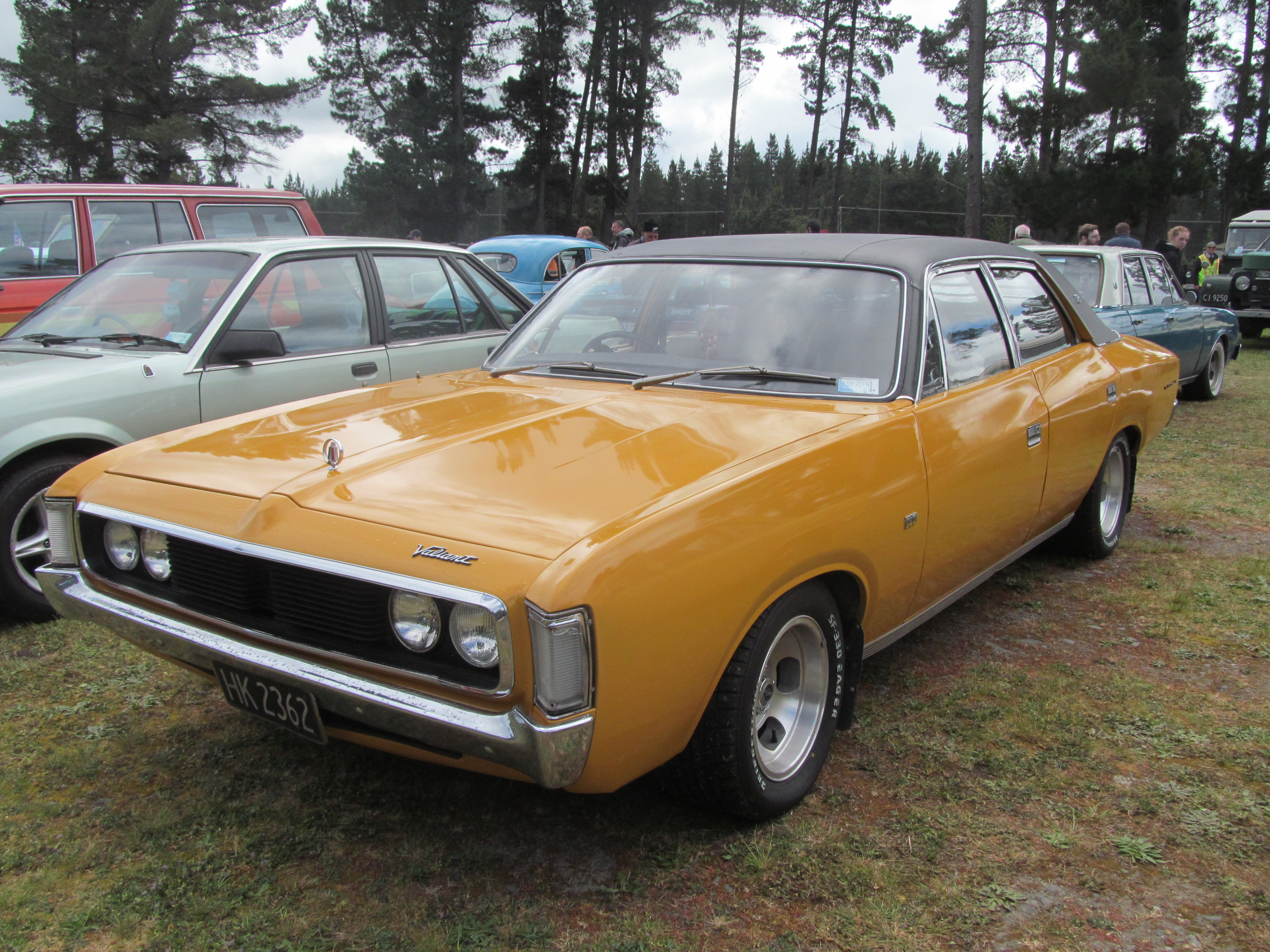
New Zealand-built VJ Regal with CH Chrysler front end

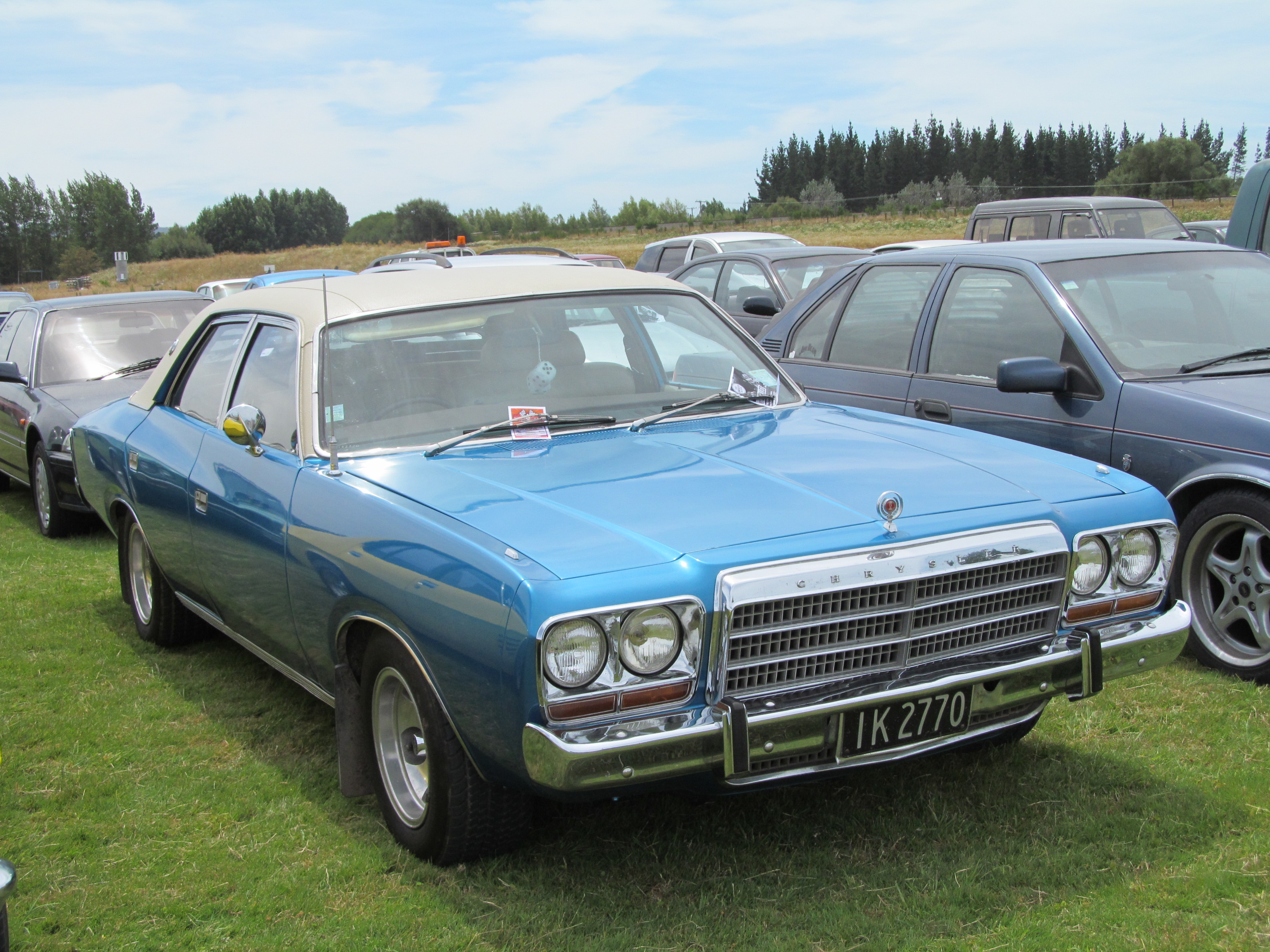
1978 CL Valiant Regal sedan (New Zealand)

=== South Africa (1960–1980) ===
Right-hand-drive Plymouth Valiants were assembled and sold in South Africa branded as the DeSoto Rebel from 1960 and were assembled at the Chrysler plant in Cape Town. The cars followed the U.S. Plymouth and Dodge Dart models and the knock-down kits were sourced from Canada. By 1966 the Valiant was the top selling car in South Africa. Although Chrysler in the U.S. stopped making Valiant and Dart station wagons after 1966, station wagons continued to be built in South Africa using U.S. front ends on Australian Valiant VC/VE/VF wagon bodies.

Between 1968 and 1970 a local version of the two-door Plymouth Barracuda was built and sold as the Valiant Barracuda (as in Canada.) Between 1970 and 1973 a local coupe model derived from the U.S. Dodge Demon and Plymouth Duster was built and sold as the Valiant Charger.

In 1972 South Africa switched fully to assembling Australian Valiants, starting with the VH Valiant. These were available in sedan, station wagon and bakkie (pickup truck/ute.) The Australian Chrysler by Chrysler two-door model was not available but the four door model was sold as the "Dodge SE" and was built with the same locally sourced 225 cid six-cylinder engine used in all South African-built Valiants.

The Australian VJ Valiant was assembled in South Africa and sold as the Valiant J series. The lineup included the Rebel, Rebel 660, Regal, Regal Safari, Charger Coupe, and the VIP. The bakkie was sold as the Fast-Body Rustler Utility thereafter.

At the end of 1976 Chrysler ceased operations in South Africa and the local operation merged with local company Illings (owned by the Anglo-American Corporation.) Thereafter South African Valiants were assembled at the Sigma Motor Corporation plant in Silverton, near Pretoria.

The last Valiants built in South Africa were the Australian Valiant CL which was built from 1975 to 1978 and the Australian Valiant CM which was built from 1978 to 1980. These were marketed as the Chrysler SE.

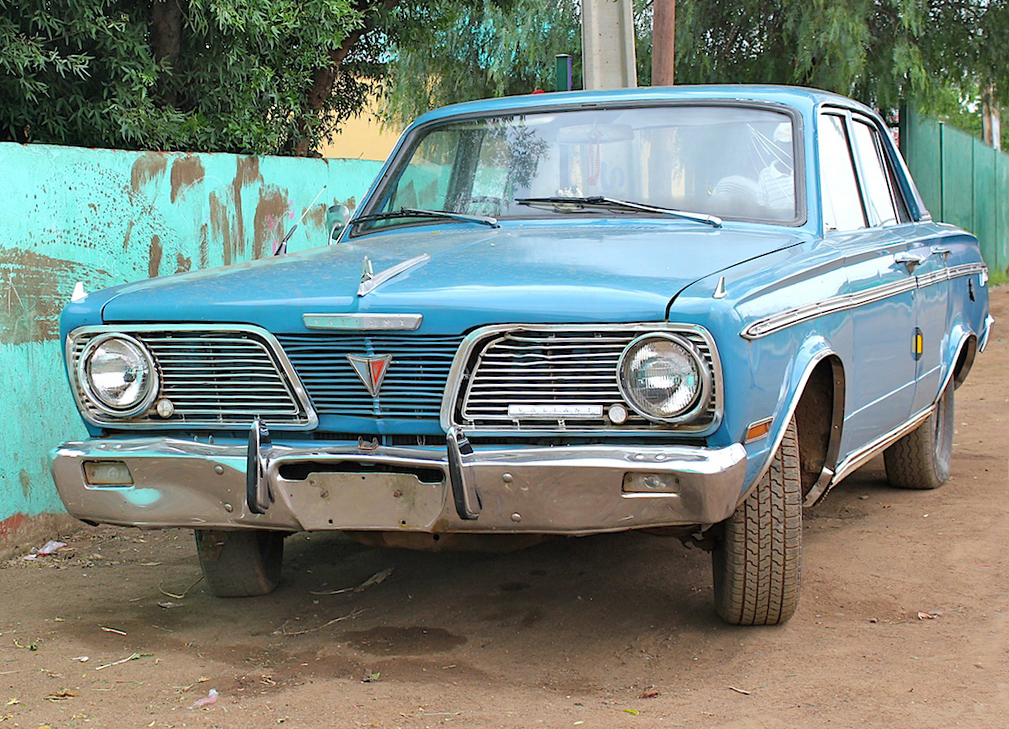
1966 South African Chrysler Valiant

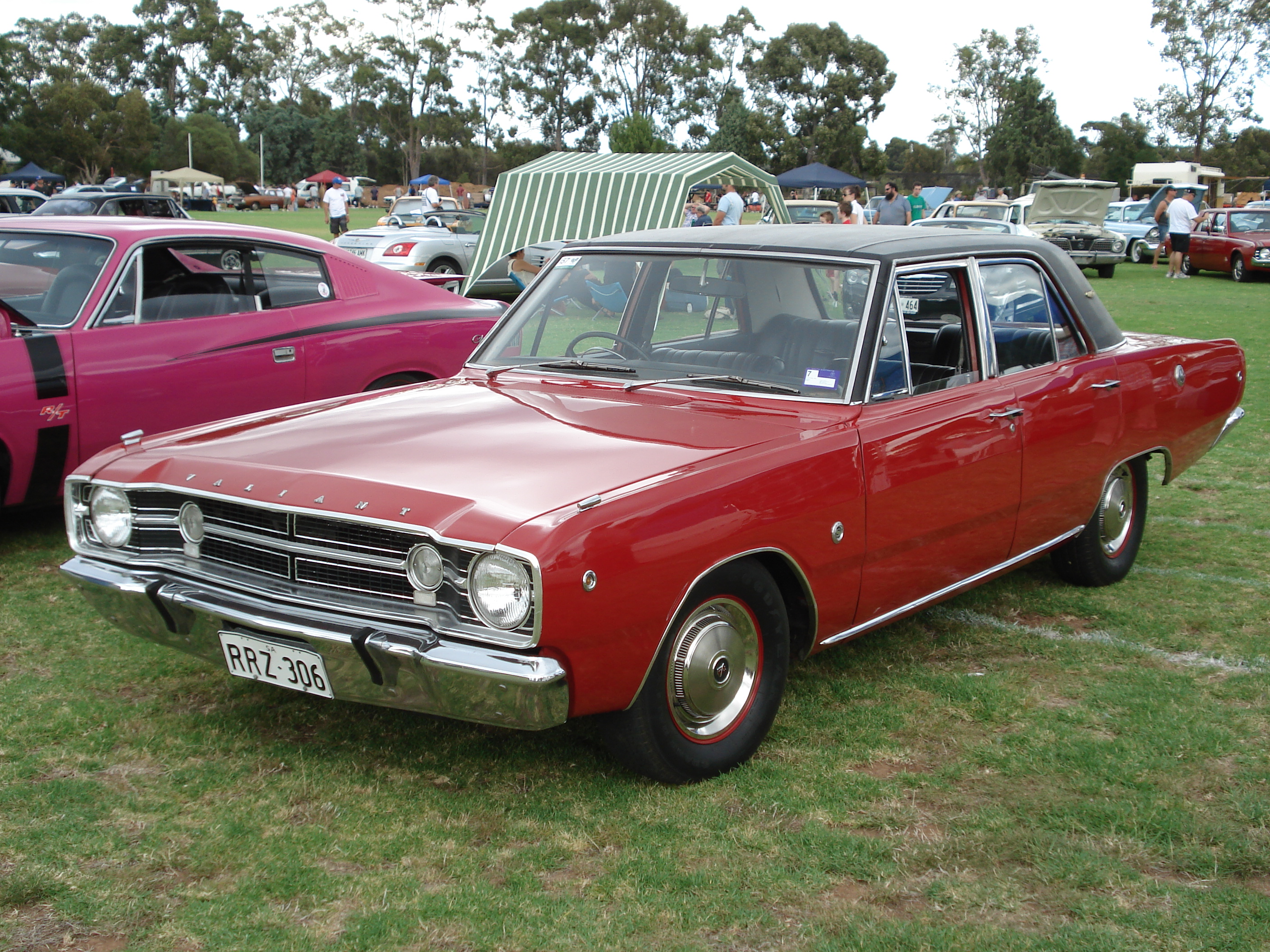
South African Chrysler Valiant VIP. This example is based on the 1968 U.S. Dodge Dart.

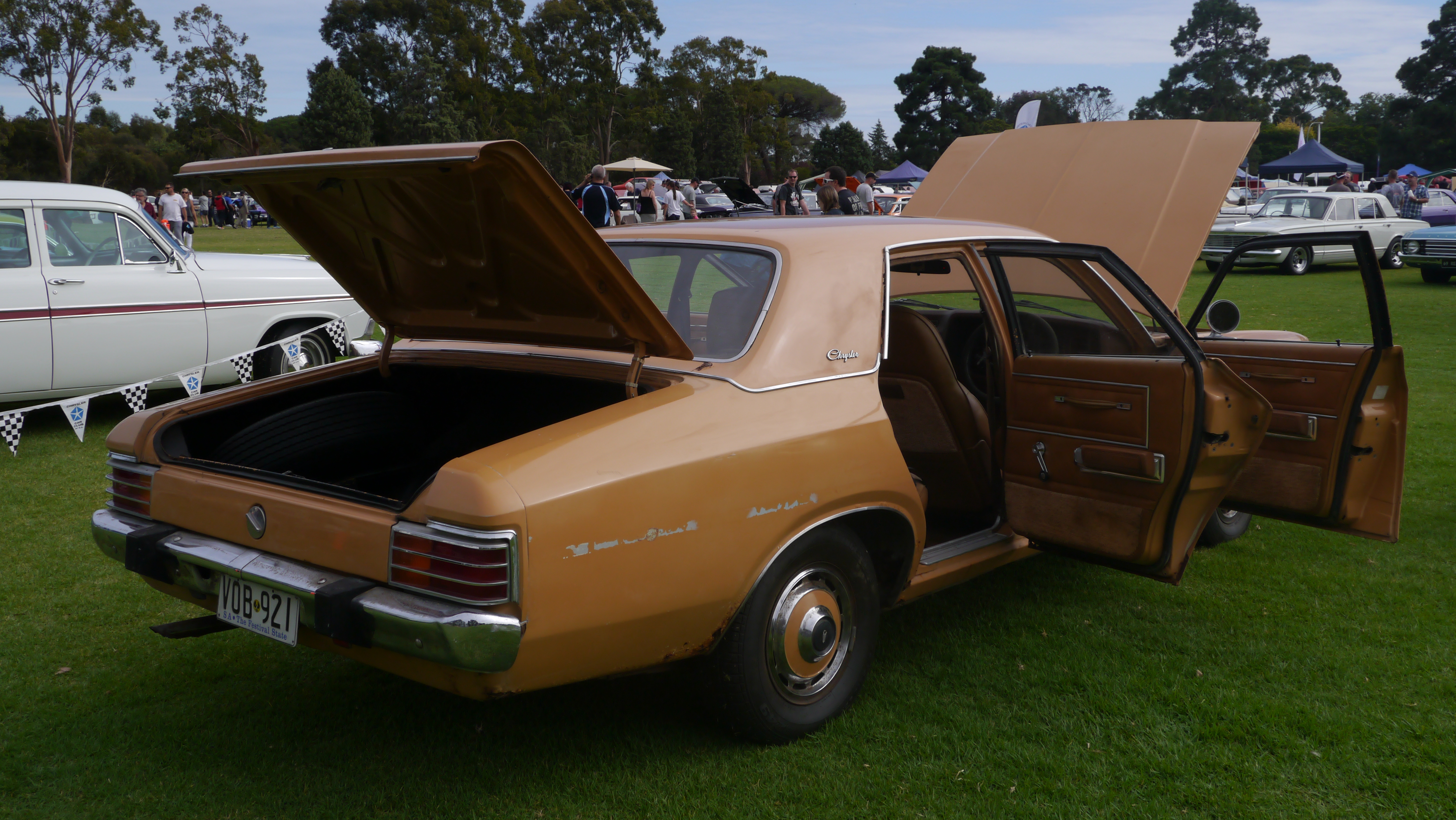
South African Chrysler Valiant SE, based on the Australian Valiant CL

=== Sweden ===
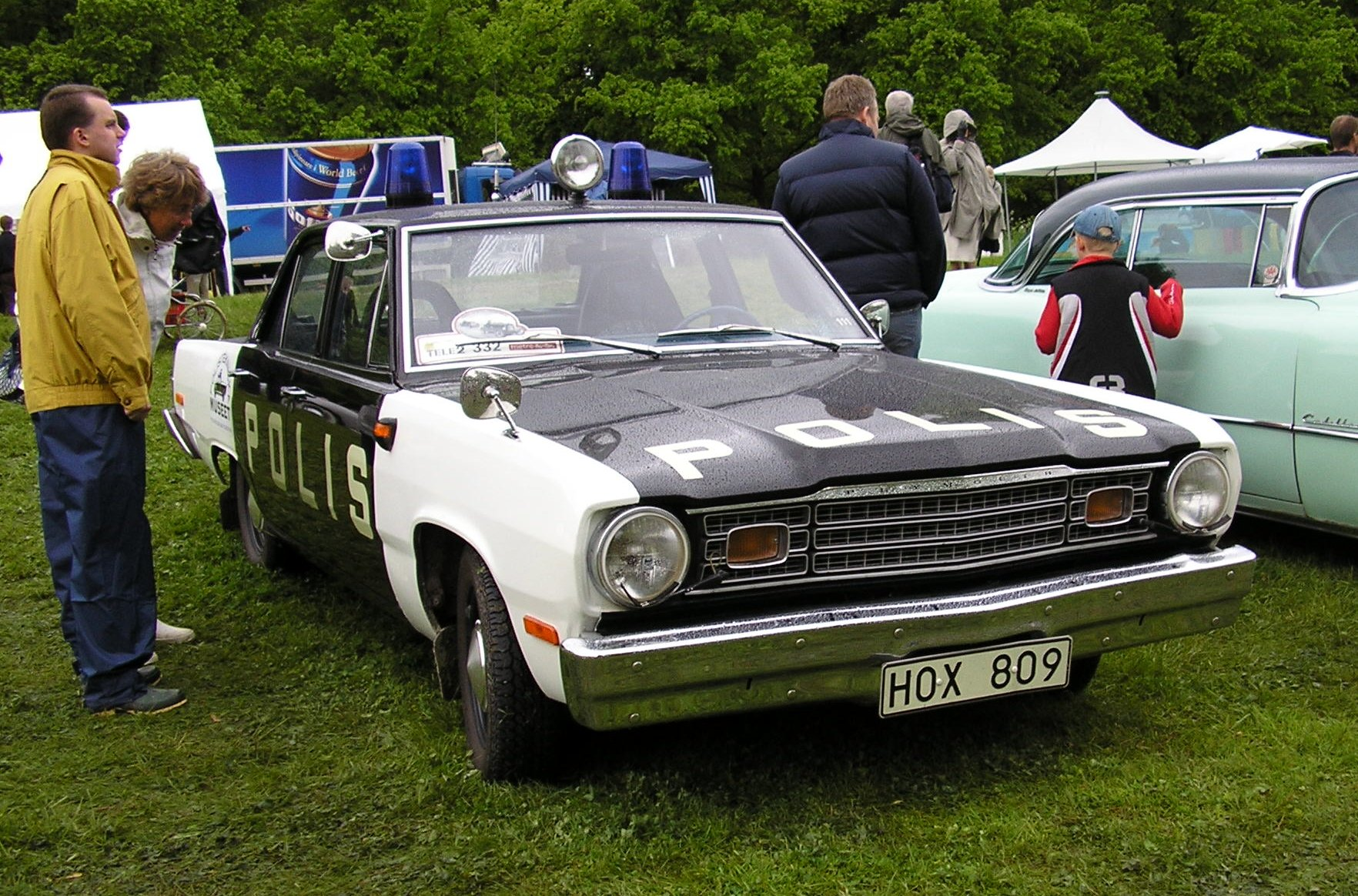
1974 Plymouth Valiant used by the Swedish Police

The first Valiants that came to Sweden were imported from the NEKAF plant in Rotterdam, Netherlands. Second-generation U.S Valiants were assembled in Sweden from Complete Knock-down kits by Saab Automobile, primarily for use as police cars but also as taxis and for private buyers. They were sold under the Plymouth marque. Local modifications included locally supplied seats and upholstery; the seats were of SAAB's distinctive design with incorporated headrests to meet the requirements of the police department. For 1974, headlight wipers became a legal requirement on new cars sold in Sweden. The headlight wiper installation required removing the headlight bezels, making for an unfinished look. Valiants continued to be assembled for Police use until 1974, with a total of 1,200 examples being sold to the Swedish National Police.

=== Switzerland ===
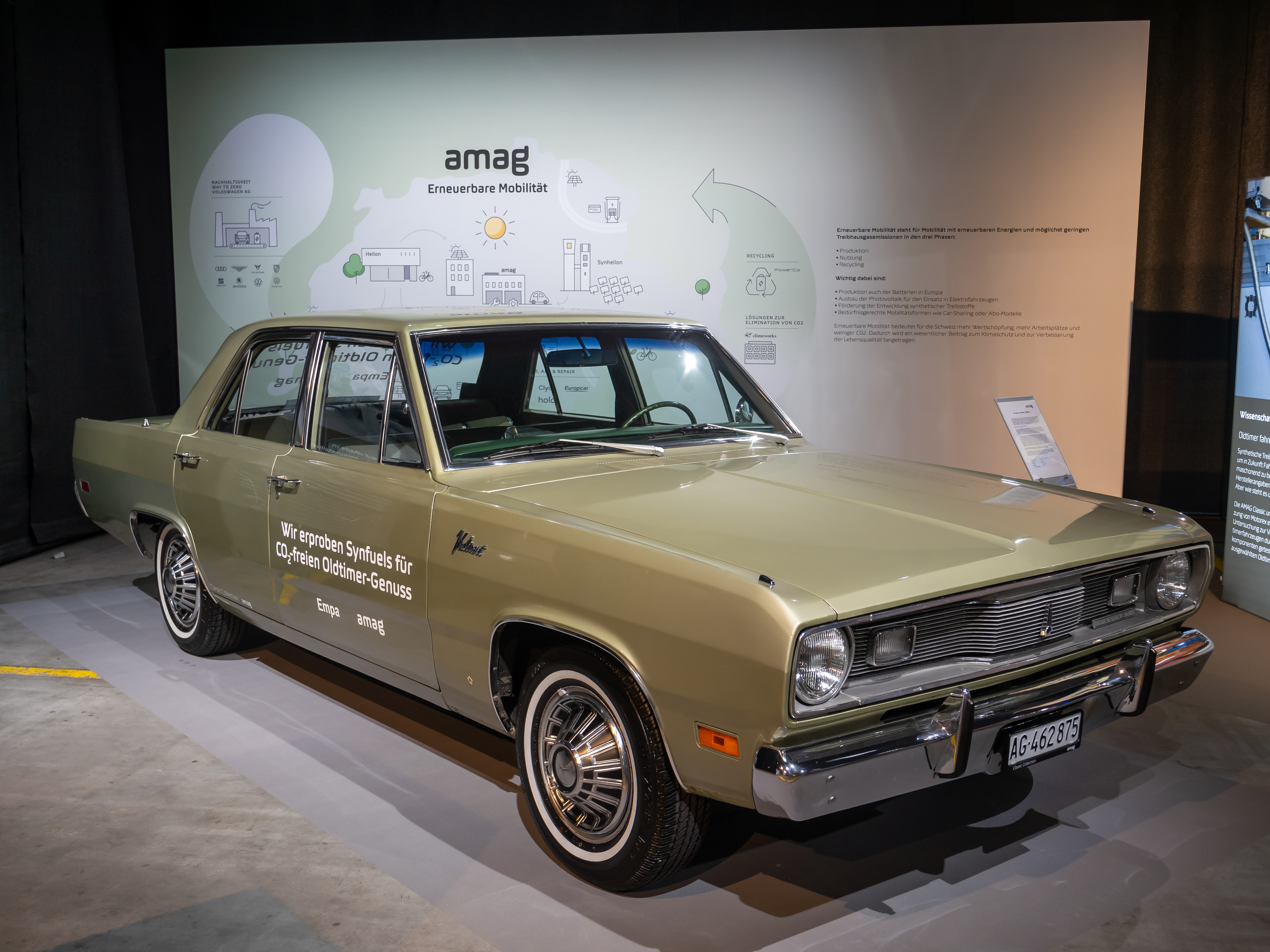
Third-generation Valiant made by AMAG, Switzerland

The third generation Plymouth Valiant was assembled by AMAG Automobil- und Motoren at their assembly plant in Schinznach. Assembly was meticulous and took over 148 hours of manual work per car (as opposed to approximately 6 hours to make one vehicle in the United States.) With the slogan "added value through Swiss assembly" the Valiant was marketed and sold successfully as a mid-range touring car. The vehicles were assembled with a high percentage of local content including glass, carpets, seats, and radiators. In 1972, Valiant assembly was discontinued.

=== United Kingdom (1960–1976) ===
Valiants were imported into the United Kingdom throughout the production period, sourced from both the United States or Canada in factory right-hand drive. Chrysler International in Belgium was in charge of all European imports. The Valiant made its public debut in 1959 at the 44th British International Motor Show in London, England. The U.K received RHD Plymouth Valiants as well as other Chrysler and Dodge vehicles until 1967 whereupon it was decided by Chrysler International that all RHD markets would thereafter be supplied with vehicles from Australia (with the exception of South Africa which continued to build U.S-derived models until 1972 before it too switched to Australian models.) Chrysler's European head office appointed Chrysler Motors Ltd. to be the Australian-import concessionaires for the U.K, and Warwick Wright Ltd. to be the distributors. The announcement was made in Autocar magazine, on 16 October 1966.

The Australian VC, VE, and VF Valiant models were thereafter imported to the U.K in saloon (sedan) and estate (station wagon) form, with the VIP model added in 1969. Rootes Group dealers sold the Australian Valiants on a shared-commission basis with Warwick Wright. Australian VG, VH, VJ, and VK Valiants continued to be sold in the U.K throughout the 1970s, including the Australian Valiant Charger coupe and long-wheelbase Chrysler By Chrysler. Imports ceased after 1976.

== In popular culture ==
Steven Spielberg's early directorial debut, the television movie Duel, prominently featured an orange 1970 Plymouth Valiant, driven by the protagonist, Dennis Weaver. When the film was expanded by 14 minutes for international theatrical release, a nearly-identical 1971 Valiant was used for additional scenes. The choice of the Valiant, according to Spielberg, was not so much for the model of the car, but rather the bright red color (which would photograph well against the high desert landscape of the filming location, near Acton, California).
