= AP6 =

AP6 or AP-6 may refer to:

- Autopista AP-6, a motorway in Spain
- USS William Ward Burrows (AP-6), a 1926 US Navy transport ship
- Asia-Pacific Partnership on Clean Development and Climate, an international non-treaty agreement among ASEAN countries launched on January 12, 2006
- The sixth Swedish national pension fund (Sjunde AP-fonden (in Swedish))
- Chrysler AP6 Valiant, a car built by Chrysler Australia from 1965 to 1966
