= Chrysler Valiant (VC) =

Australian full-size car

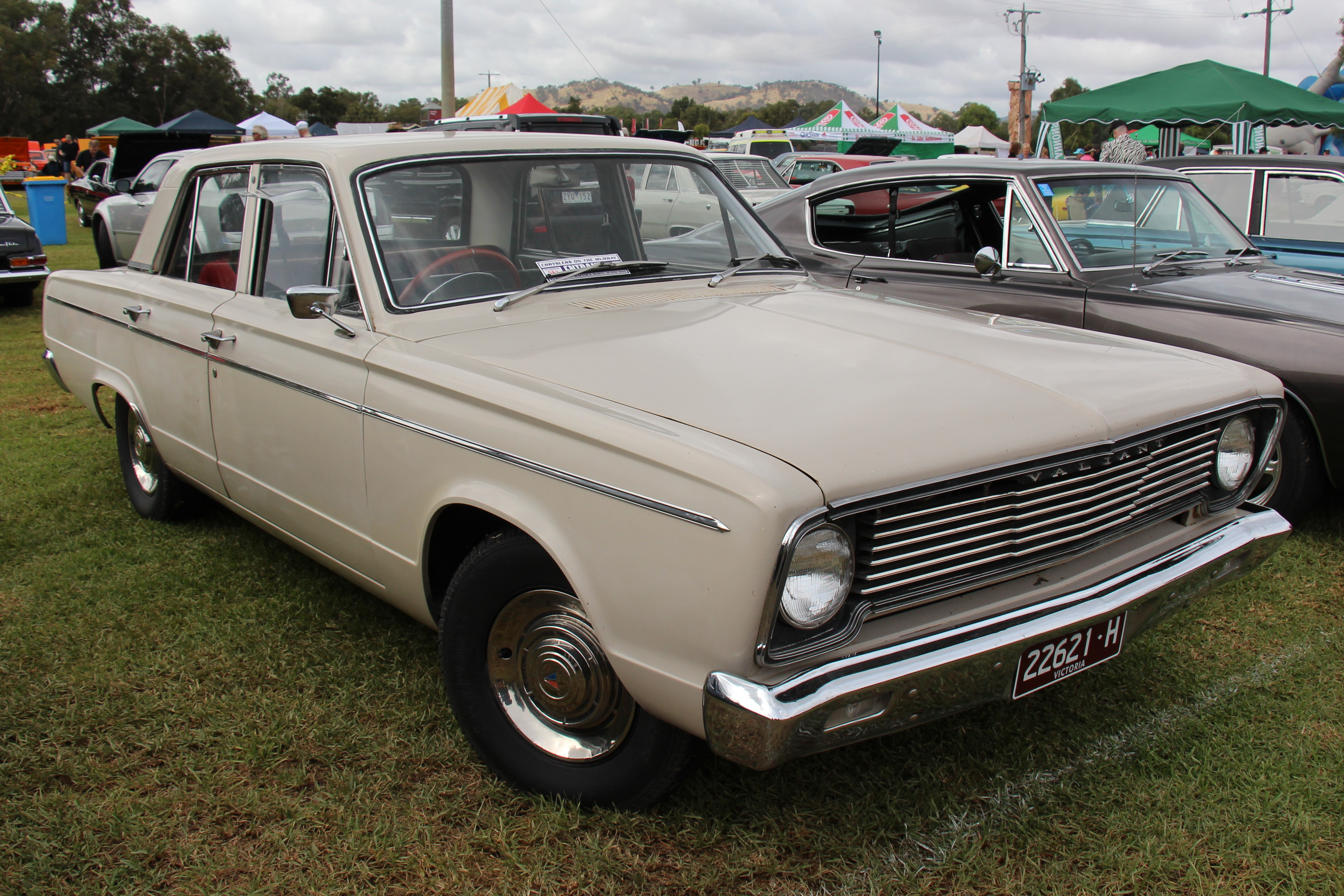
- Chrysler Valiant sedan

Overview
- Manufacturer: Chrysler Australia
- Also called: Dodge 106 heavy duty utility
- Production: March 1966 – September 1967
- Assembly: Australia: Tonsley Park; New Zealand: Petone (Todd Motors)

Body and chassis
- Body style: 4-door sedan 5-door station wagon 2-door coupe utility
- Layout: FR layout

Powertrain
- Engine: 225 cu in (3.7 L) I6; 273 cu in (4.5 L) V8
- Transmission: 3-speed manual 3-speed automatic

Dimensions
- Wheelbase: 106.0 inches (2692 mm) (sedan)
- Length: 188.3 inches (4782 mm) (sedan)
- Width: 69.0 inches (1753 mm) (sedan)
- Height: 55.0 inches (1397 mm) (sedan)
- Kerb weight: 2774 lb (1258 kg) (sedan)

Chronology
- Predecessor: Chrysler AP6 Valiant
- Successor: Chrysler VE Valiant

The Chrysler Valiant (VC) is an automobile that was produced in Australia by Chrysler Australia from 1966 to 1967. It was released in March 1966, replacing the Chrysler AP6 Valiant. The VC was the fifth Chrysler Valiant model to be produced in Australia.

== Overview ==
The VC Valiant was longer and lower than any previous Australian Valiant model, and was based on the 1965–1966 U.S. Plymouth Valiant which itself was essentially a facelift of the 1963–1964 model, Chrysler Australia photographs of early VC's show them bearing the model designation AP7. While the equivalent U.S. Valiant came with a split-grille, the VC came with a new full-sized grille. Although made in Australia, it's front bumper, fenders and bonnet were shared with the U.S. model.

Different to the U.S. model, the VC had new rear styling with vertical taillights. Wagons and utilities carried over the rear lights and panels from their AP6 predecessors, with wagons receiving the new rear bumper and utilities carrying over the previous models bumperettes. The VC range displayed a greater degree of differentiation between models with the Valiant, Regal and V8 each having unique exterior decoration and trim.

Regal and V8 models had a chrome strip situated near the lower edge of the doors and V8 models featured a vinyl roof, bucket seats and a floor mounted gear selector with full length centre console, as well as V8 badges on the rear roof pillar, bootlid, bonnet emblem and hubcaps.

V8 sedans also featured three horizontal chrome bars on the rear quarter panel. Front disc brakes were introduced as an option in November 1966.

== Model range ==
The VC series Valiant was offered in 4-door sedan, 5-door station wagon and 2-door coupe utility models.

- Valiant 225 sedan (VC-M41)
- Valiant 225 Safari wagon (VC-M45)
- Valiant Regal sedan (VC-H41)
- Valiant Regal Safari wagon (VC-H45)
- Valiant 273 V8 sedan (VC-P41)
- Valiant 273 V8 Safari wagon (VC-P45)
- Valiant Wayfarer utility (VC-M20)
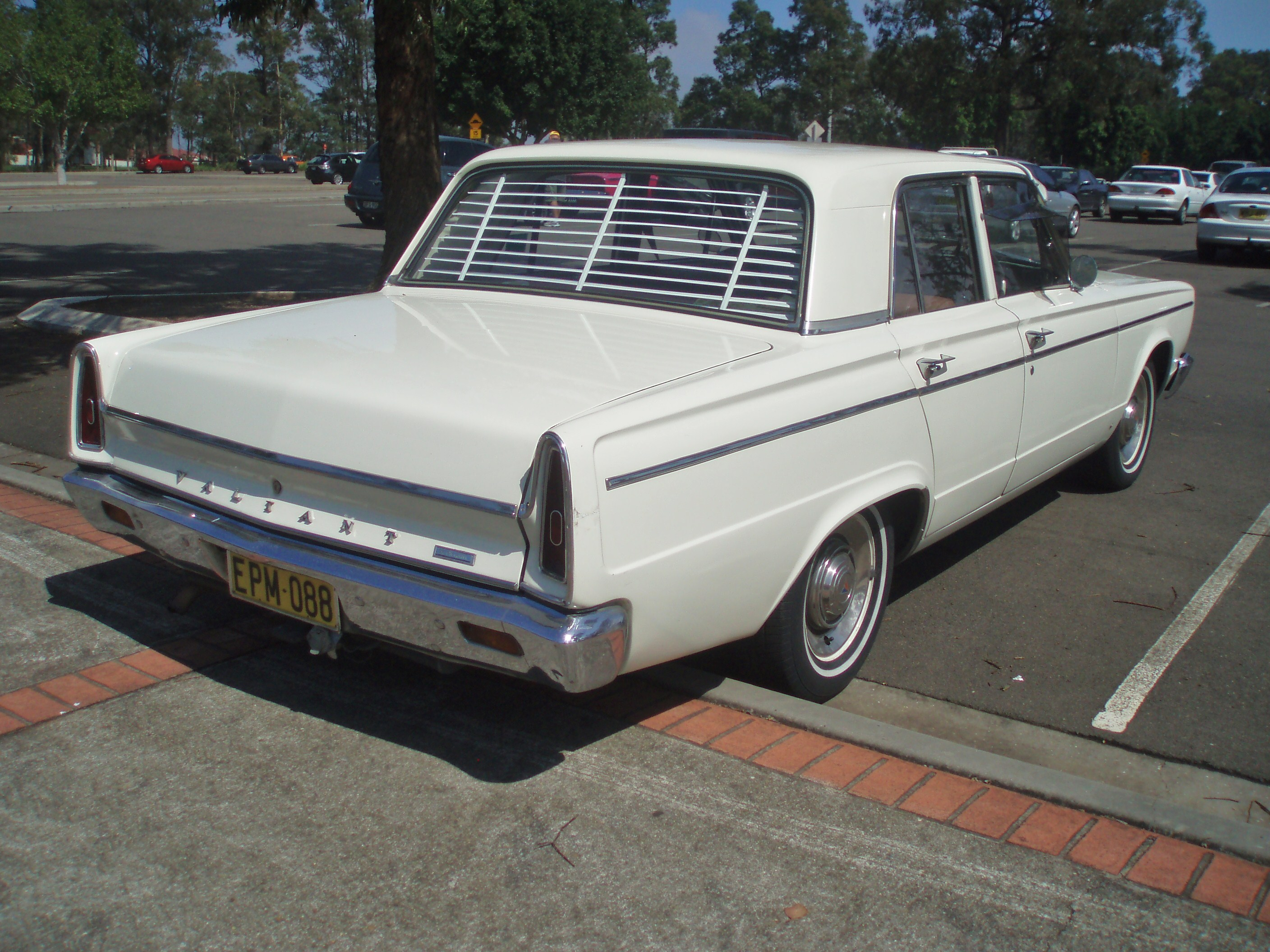
Chrysler VC Valiant sedan

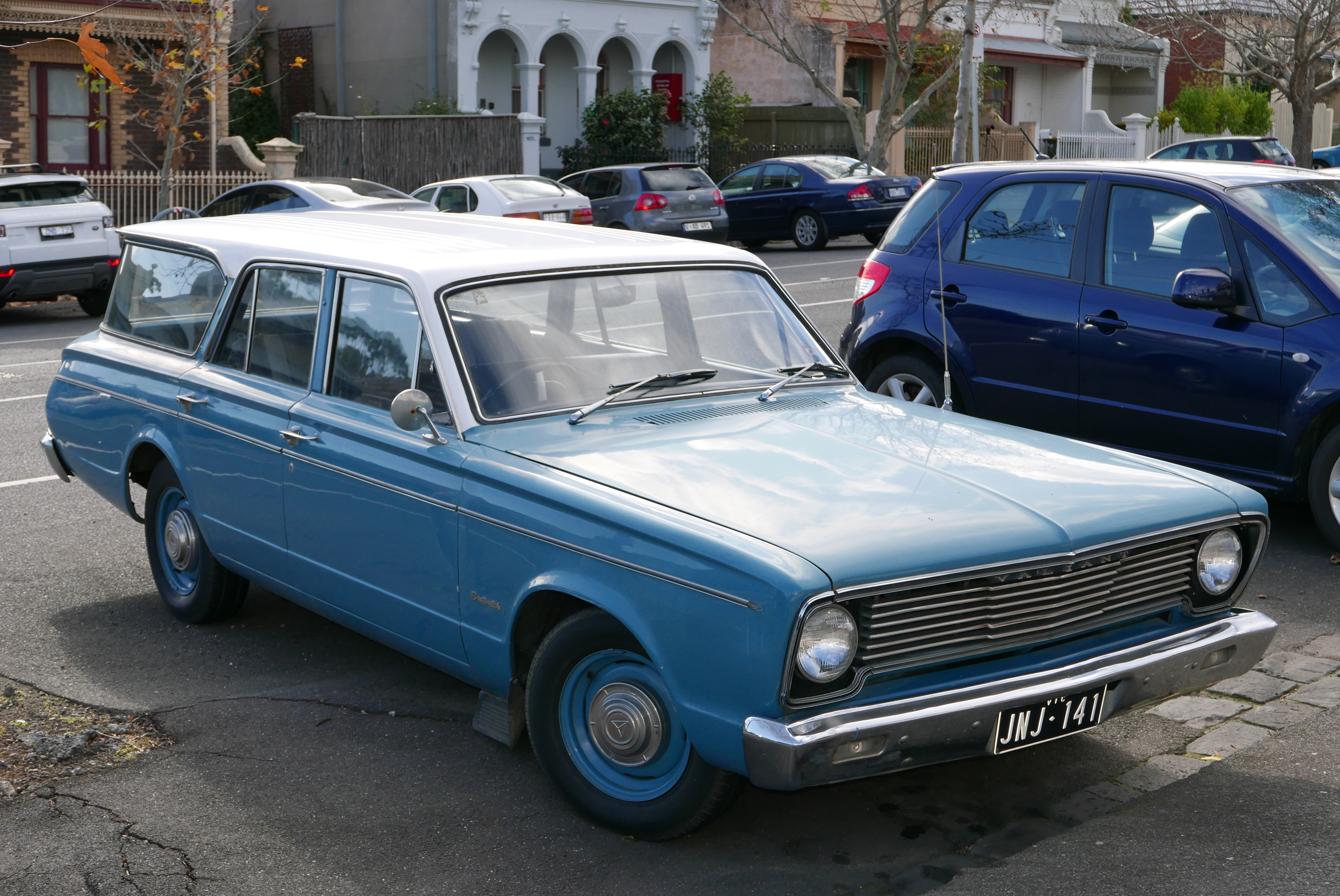
Chrysler VC Valiant Safari wagon

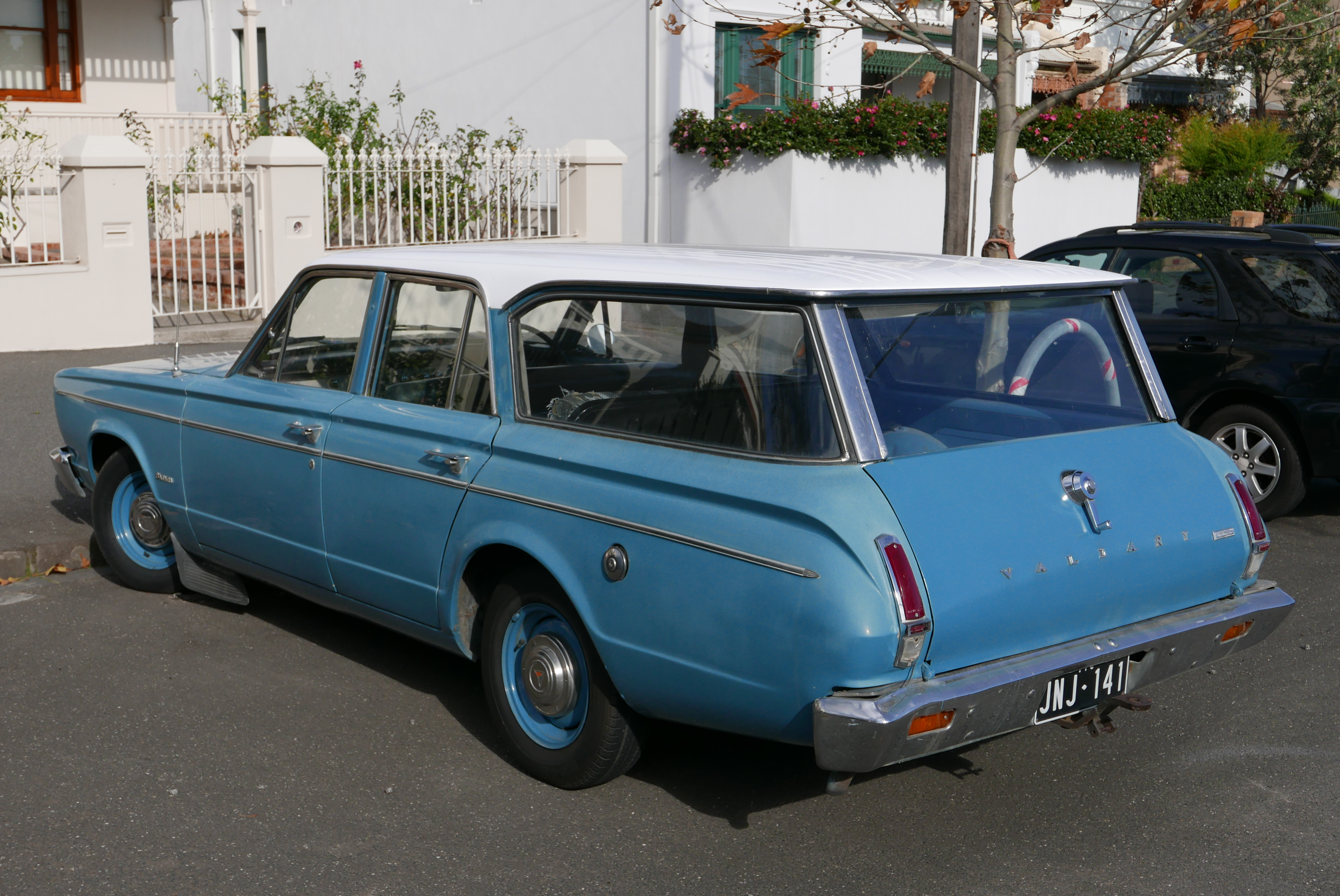
Chrysler VC Valiant Safari wagon

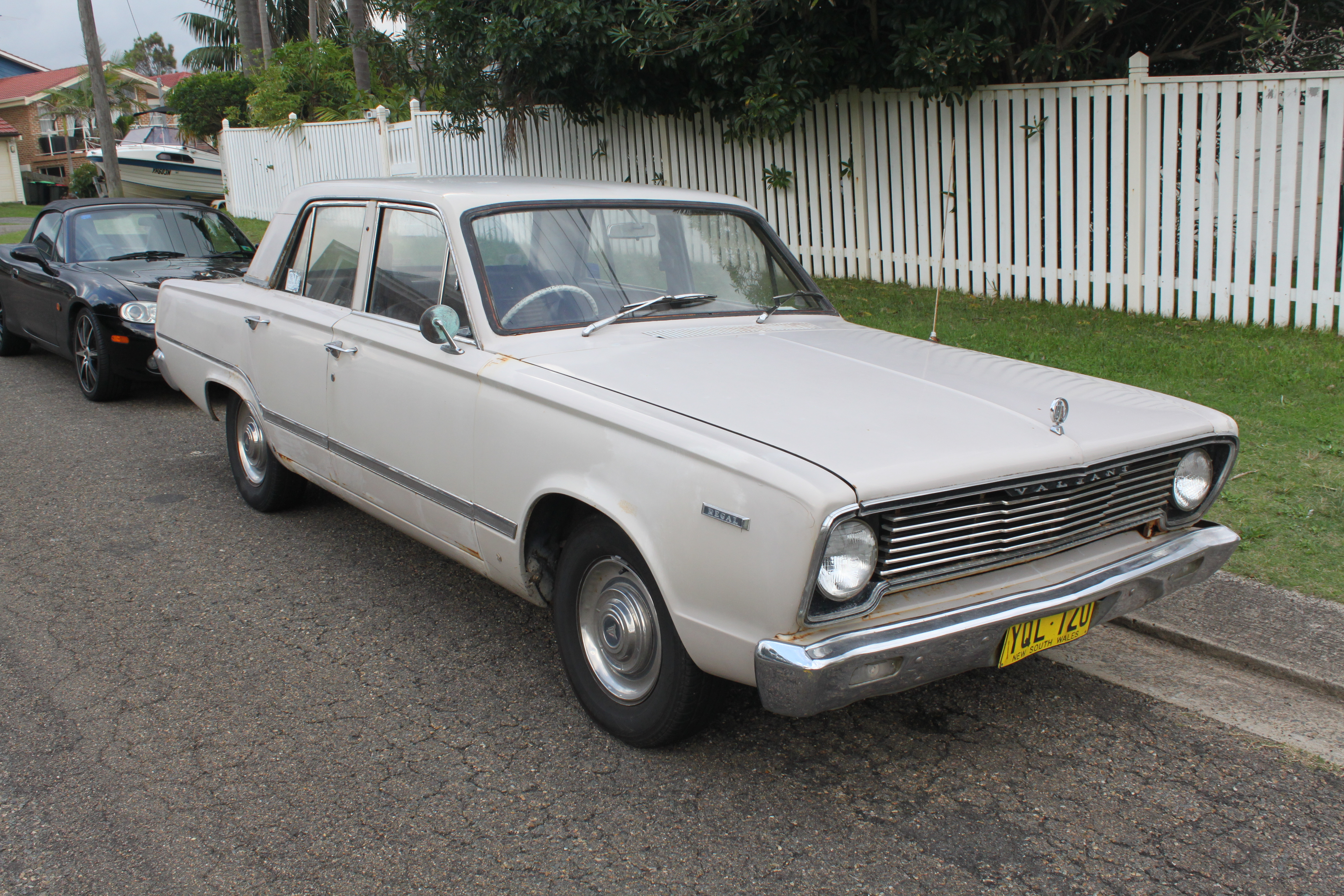
Chrysler VC Valiant Regal sedan

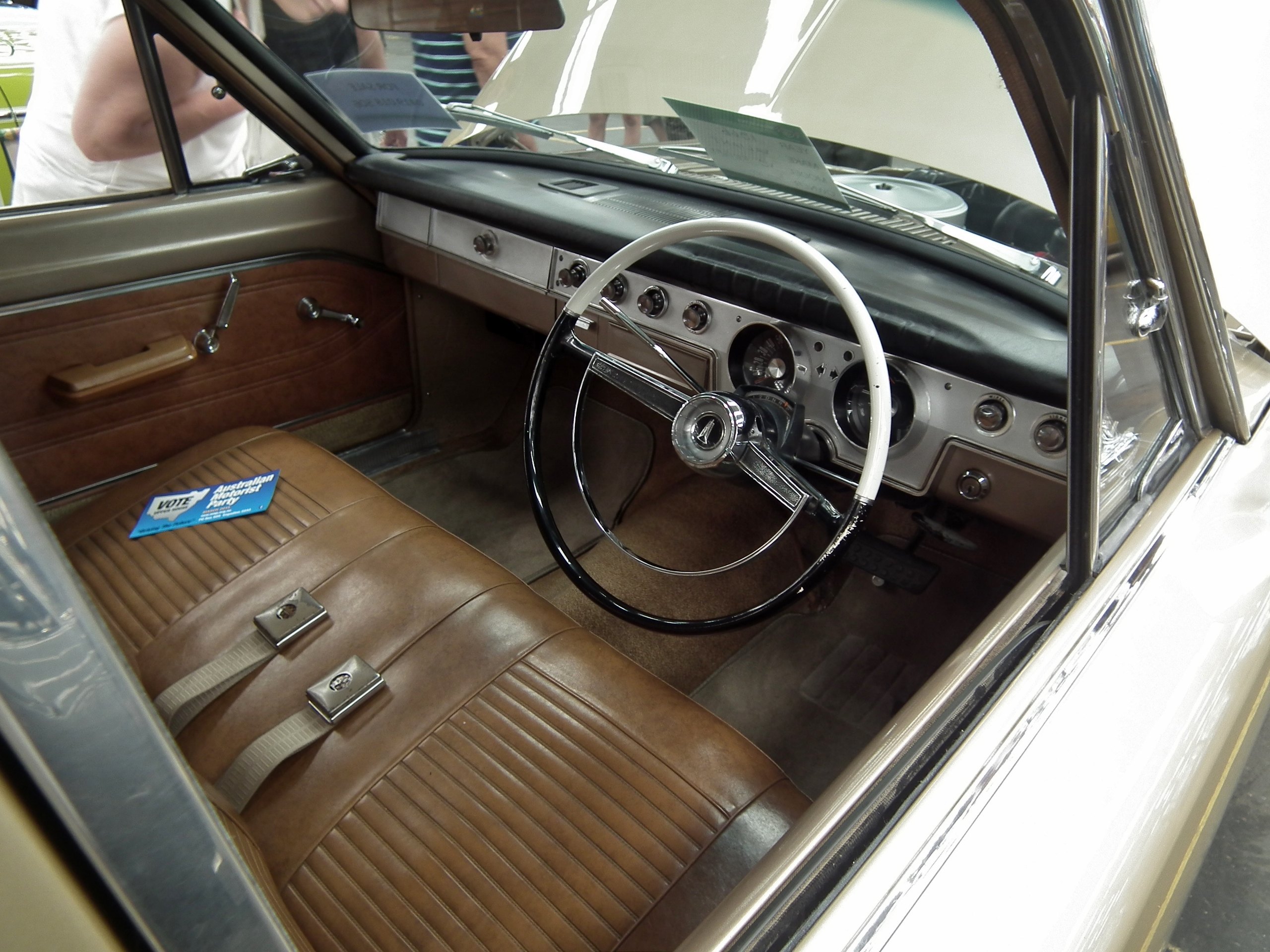
Chrysler VC Valiant Regal sedan interior

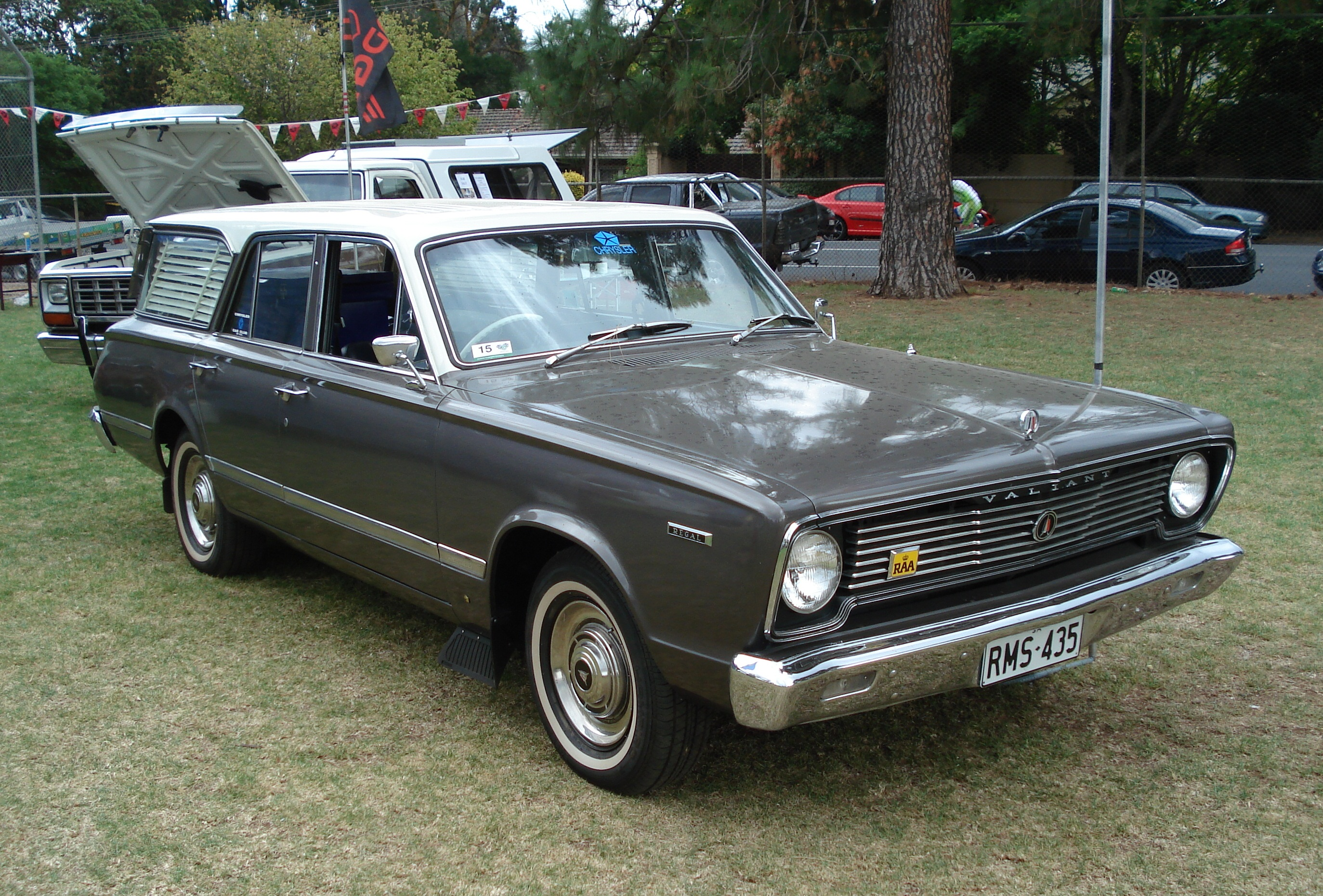
Chrysler VC Valiant Regal Safari wagon

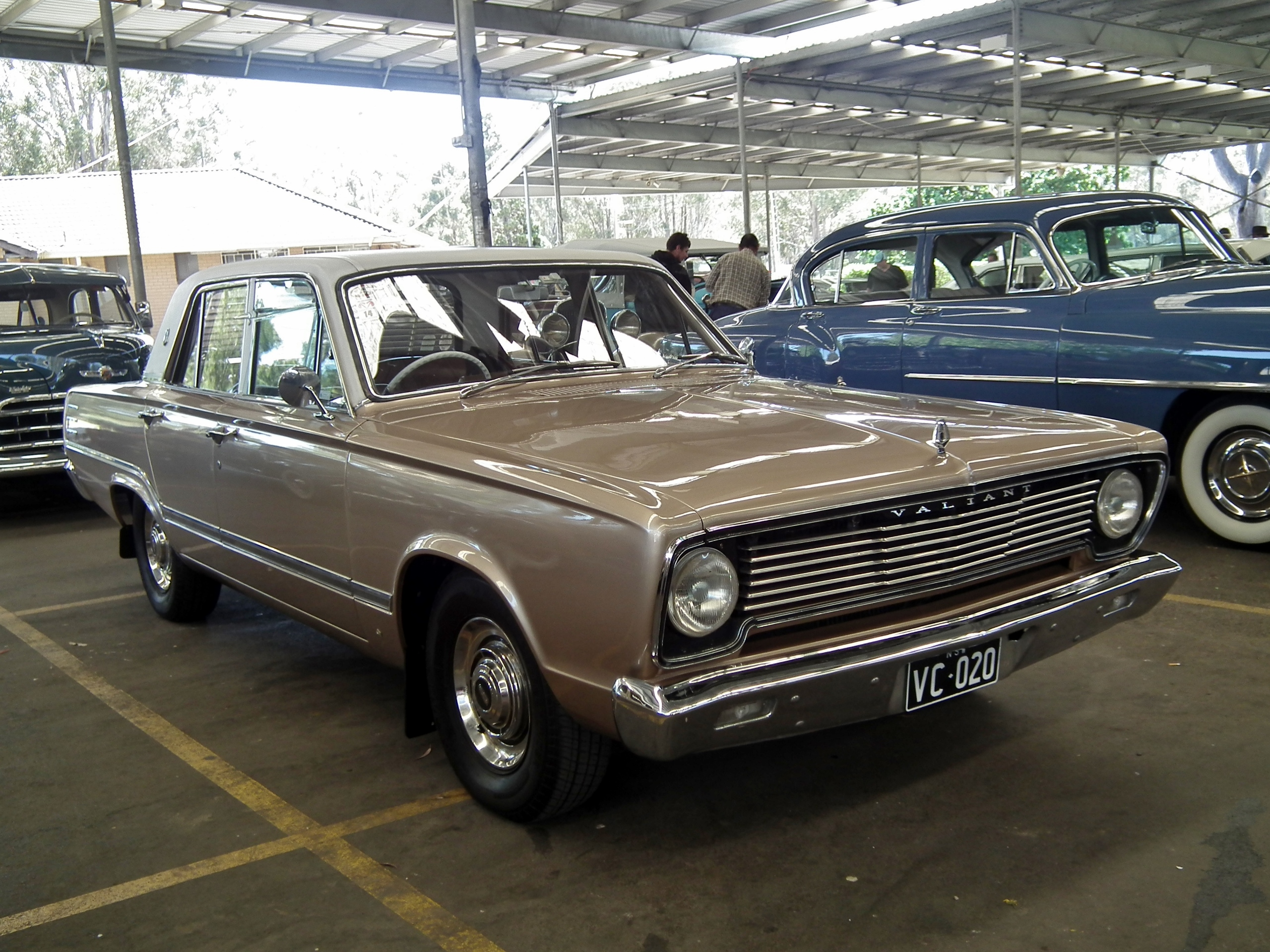
Chrysler VC Valiant V8 sedan

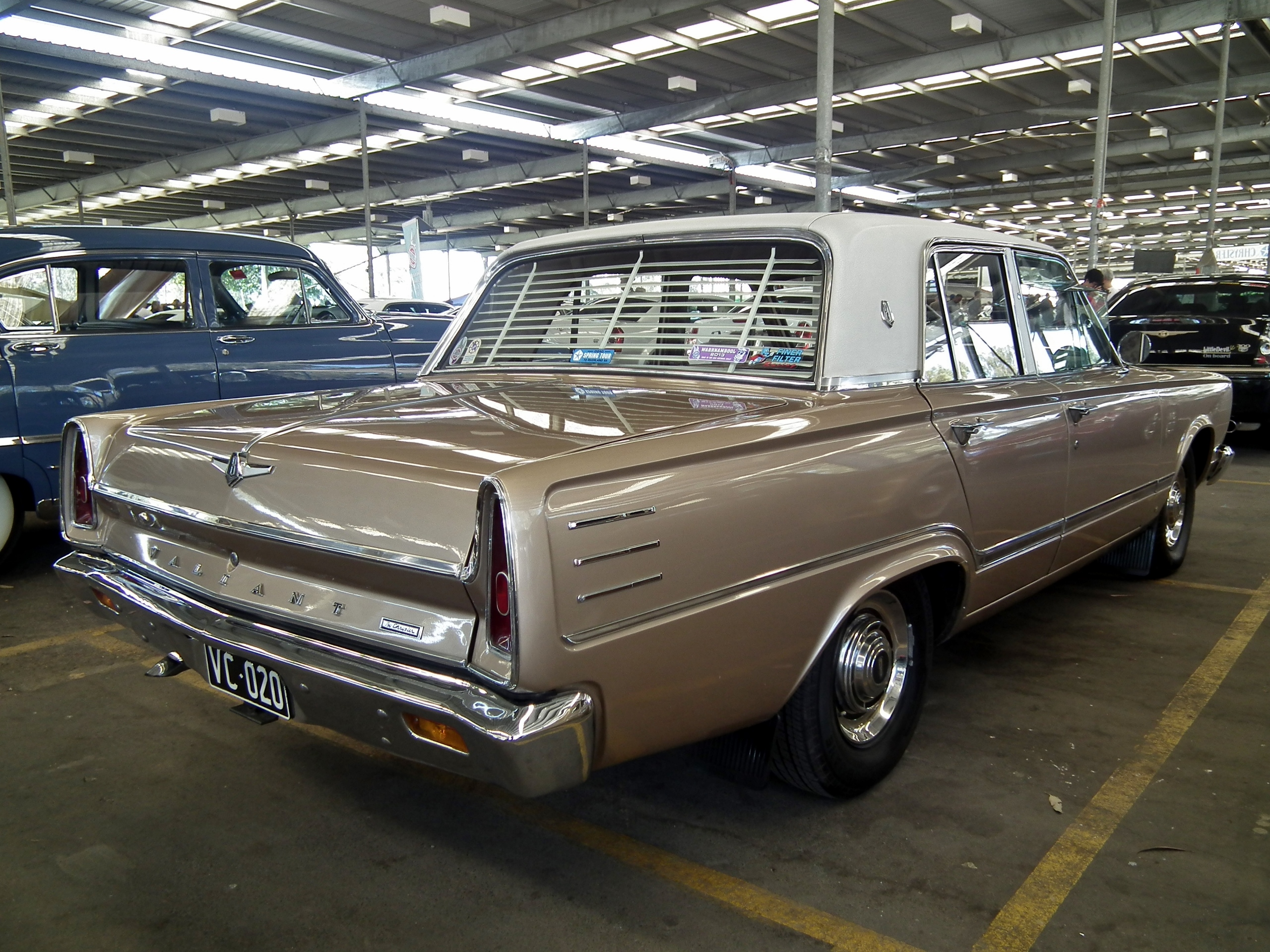
Chrysler VC Valiant V8 sedan - note three horizontal chrome stripes on rear quarter panel to further differentiate V8 sedan from Regal

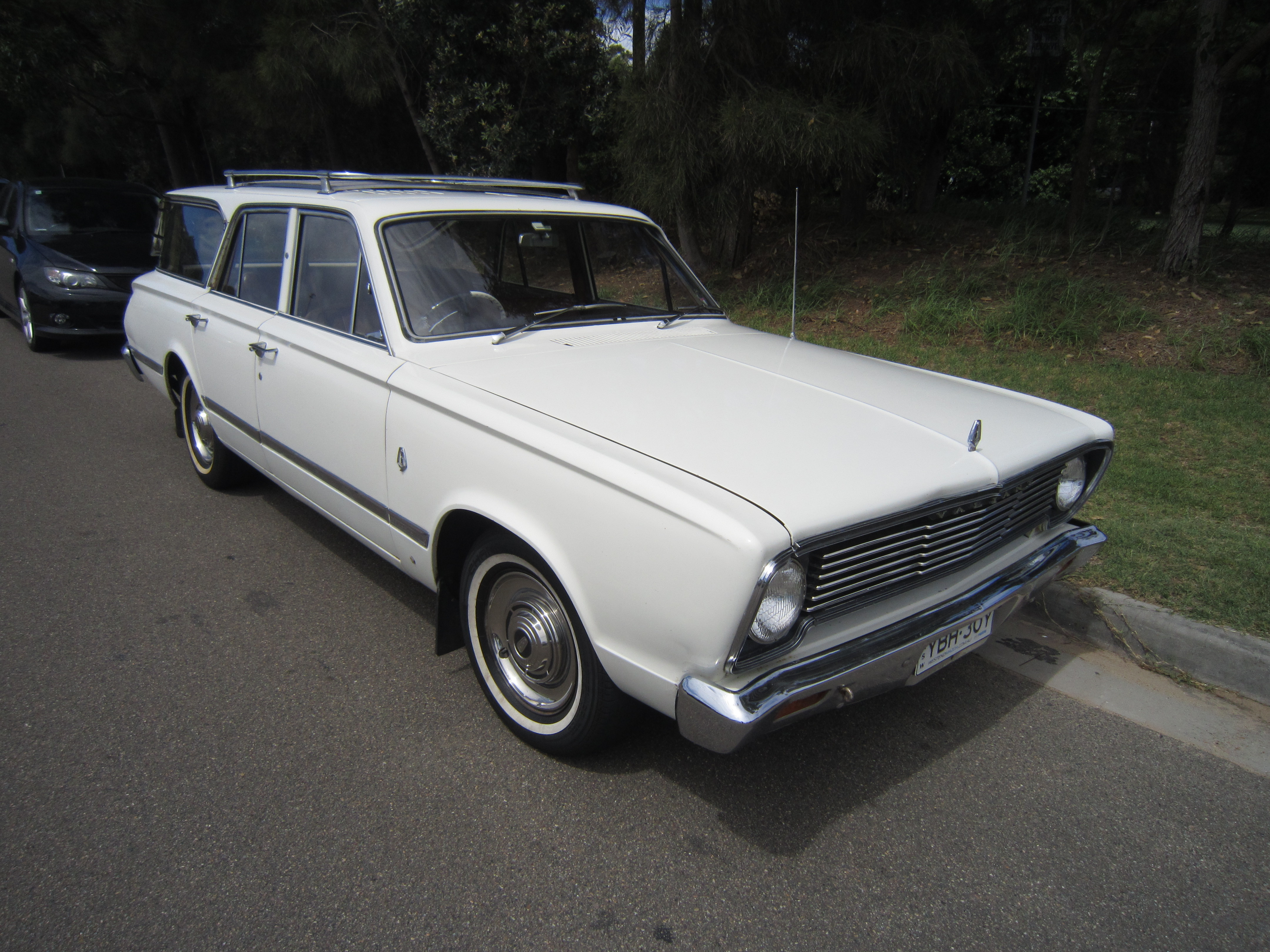
Chrysler VC Valiant V8 Safari wagon

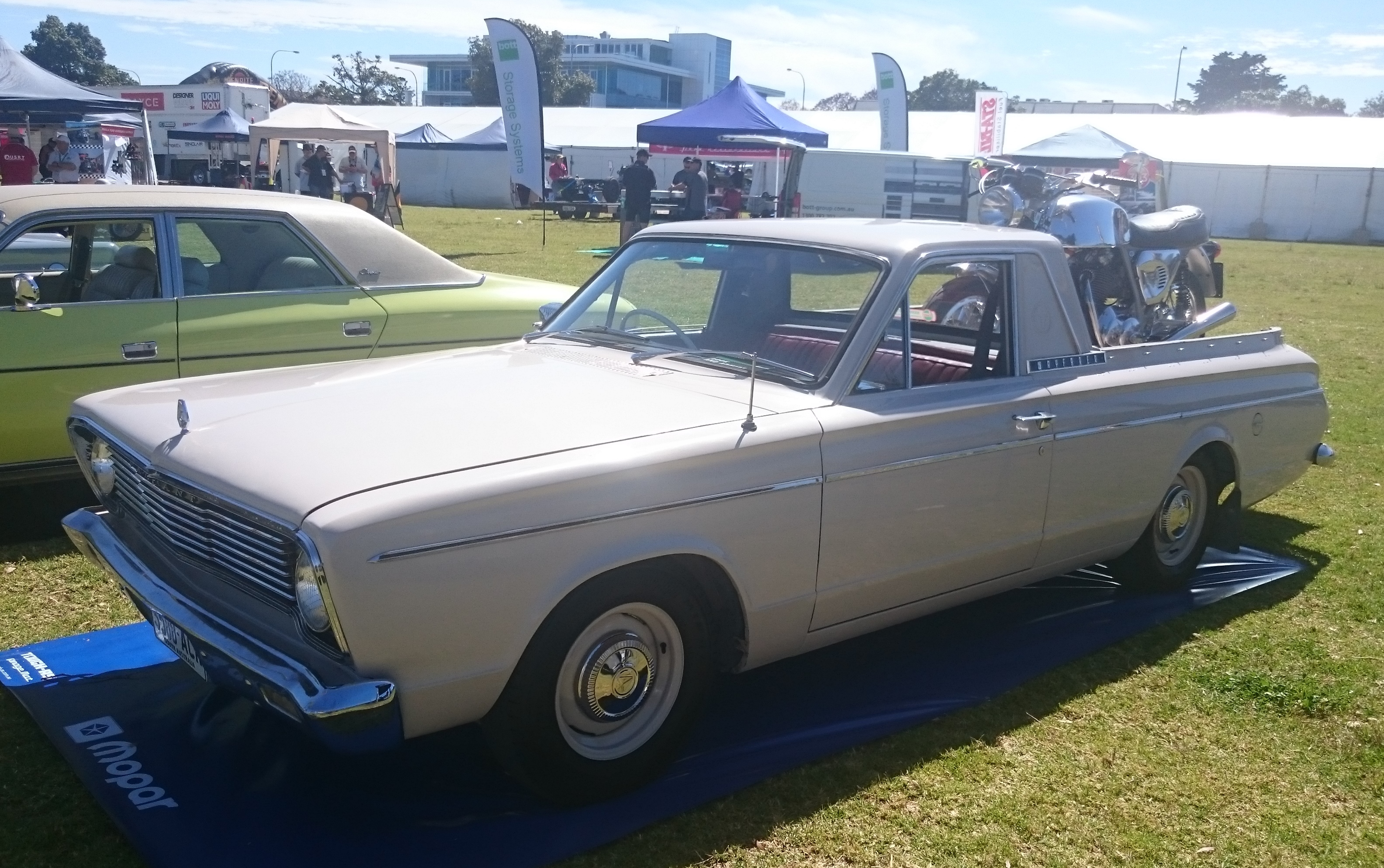
Chrysler VC Valiant Wayfarer utility

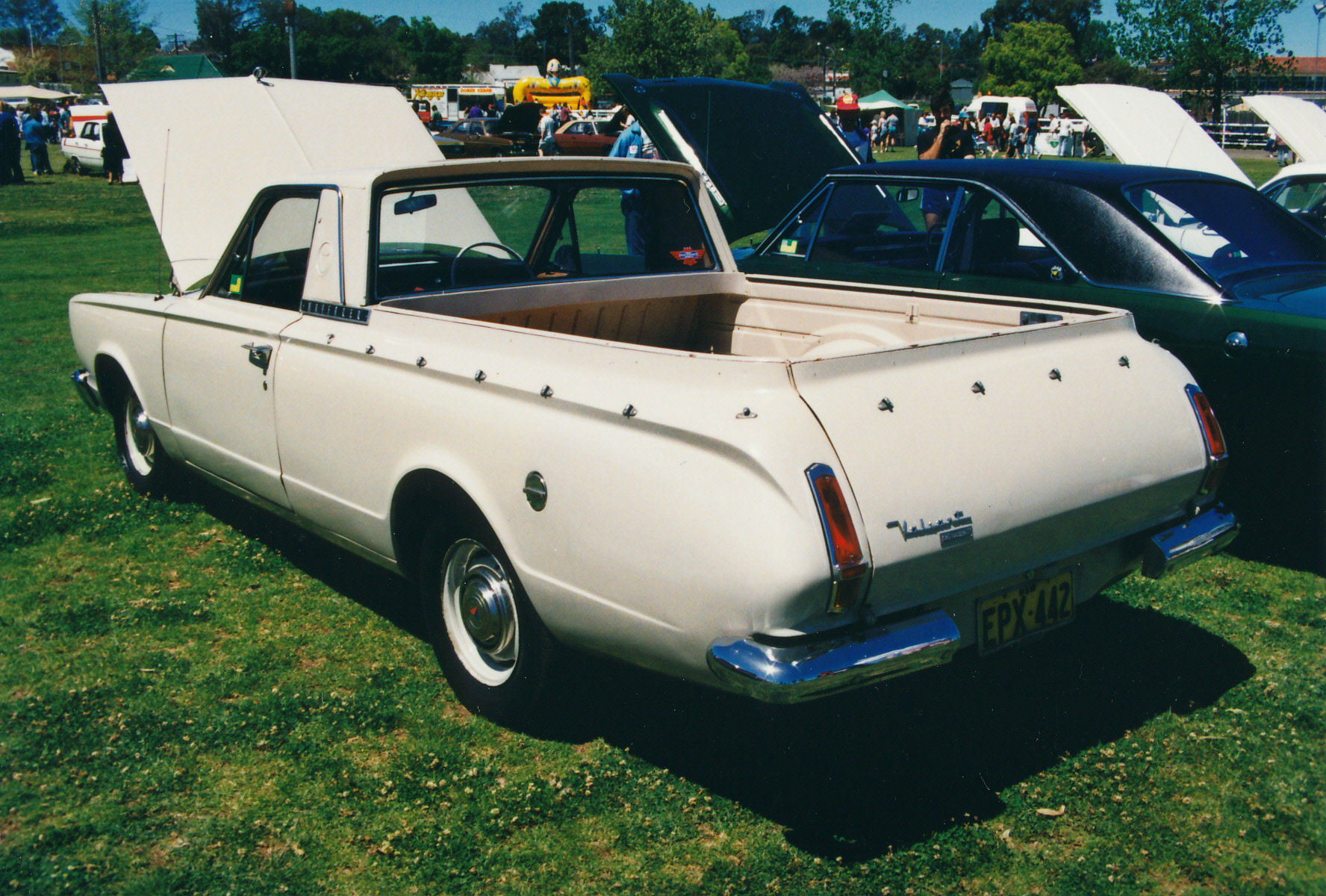
Chrysler VC Valiant Wayfarer utility - note rear bumperettes carried over from the previous AP6 utility

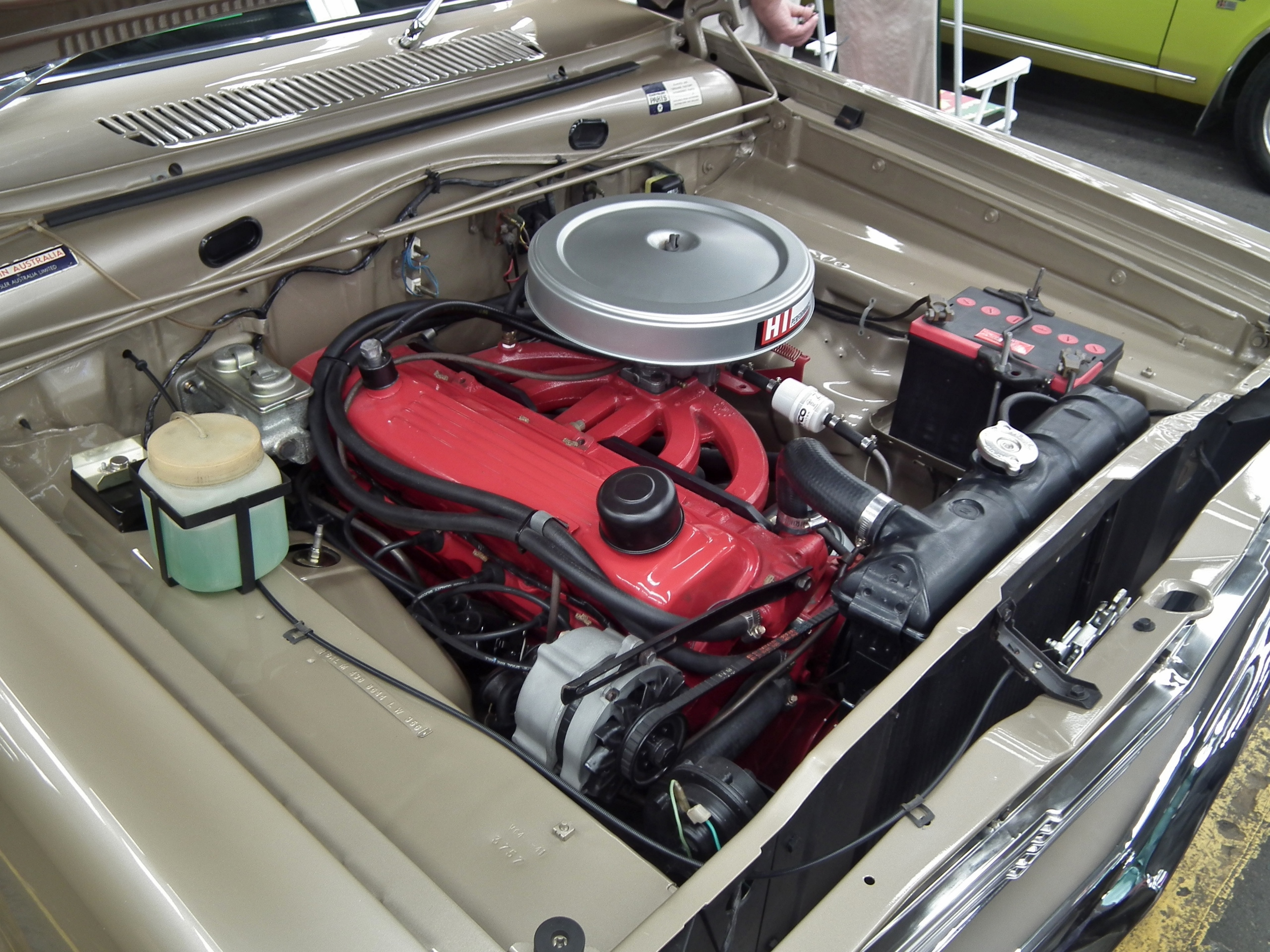
225 cubic inch slant six as fitted to VC Valiant and Regal range

=== Dodge 106 heavy duty utility ===
A variant of the Valiant Wayfarer utility was marketed as the Dodge 106 heavy duty utility. The Dodge had a 1,500 lb load capacity, as against the 1,200 lb capacity of the Wayfarer, and was visually differentiated by less chrome and exterior decoration.

== Engines and transmissions ==
A 225 cu in (3.7 L) Straight-six engine was fitted to all models other than the 273 V8 sedan and wagon, which were powered by a 273 cu in (4.5 L) V8 engine. Base models were available with either three speed manual transmission or three speed automatic transmission, whilst Regals and 273 V8s were fitted with a three speed automatic as standard.

== Production and replacement ==
A total of 65,634 VC Valiants were built prior to its replacement by the VE Valiant range in 1967.

== Motorsport ==
Two VC Valiant V8 automatic sedans contested the 1966 Gallaher 500 endurance race at Mount Panorama, Bathurst, finishing first and second in Class D. They placed 10th and 11th outright, beaten only by the Morris Cooper S which filled the first nine places.

== Police Cars ==
Chrysler Australia produced 33 or 34 (actual figure is disputed) Valiant sedans with the base level trim, but equipped with the 273 V8, for use by Victoria and South Australia Police forces as high speed pursuit vehicles. These show in the production records as model code V41. Regular production base model Valiants used model code M41, whilst regular production V8 with the luxury trim used model code P41. Externally they were identical to the regular six cylinder Valiant sedans, and had standard base trim level interiors instead of the luxury interior of the regular production V8s

== United Kingdom ==
Australian Chryslers were brought into the United Kingdom through Warwick Wright Ltd. beginning with the VC Series. Several VC Valiant sedans and station wagons were presented at the October 1966 British International Motor Show in London. The cars were sold through Rootes Group dealerships on a shared commission basis with Warwick Wright.
