= Chrysler Valiant (AP5) =

Australian full-size car

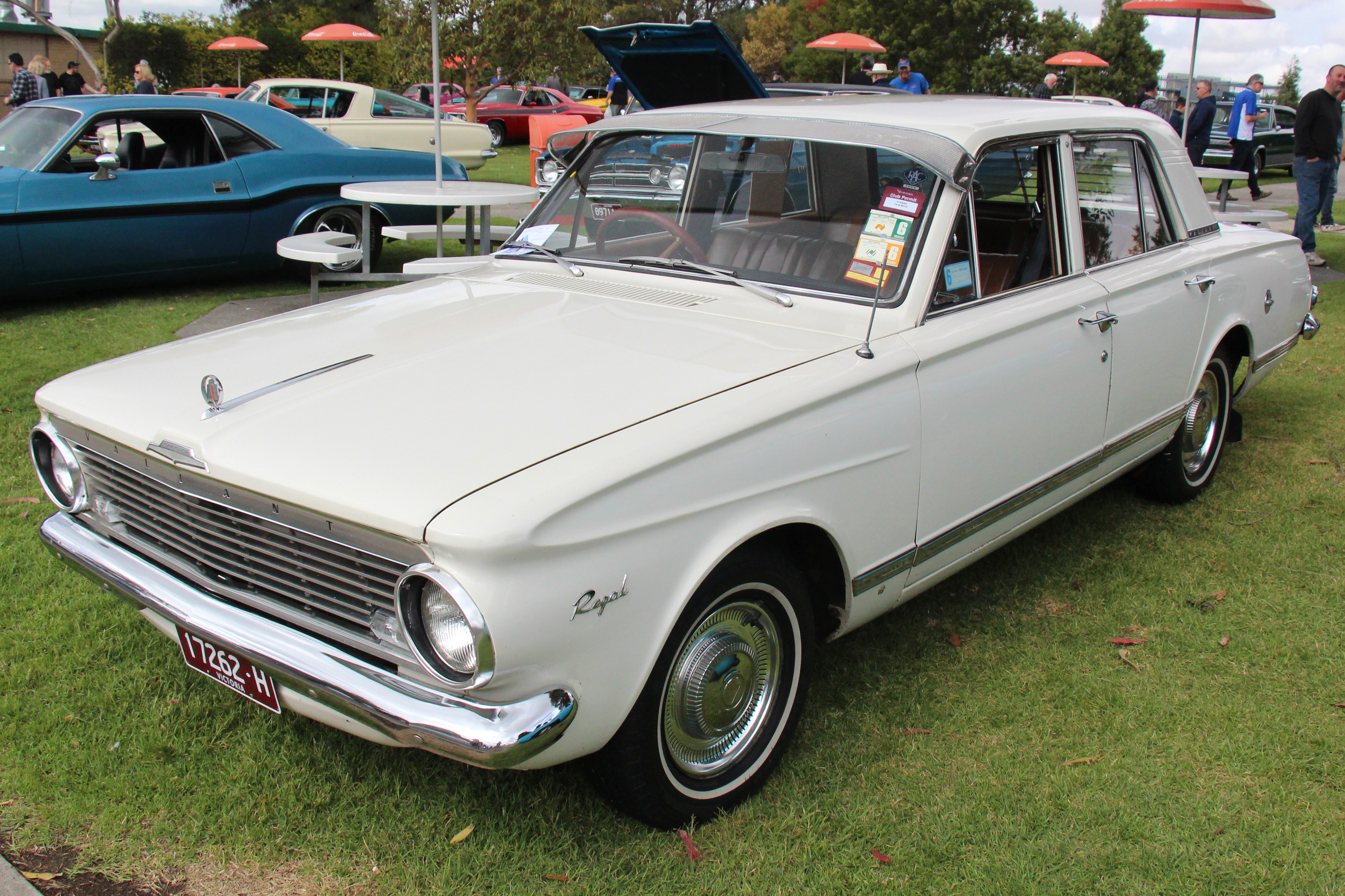
- Chrysler Valiant Regal sedan

Overview
- Manufacturer: Chrysler Australia
- Production: May 1963 – February 1965; 49,440 produced
- Assembly: Australia: Mile End (1963–1964); Australia: Tonsley Park (from 1964); New Zealand: Petone (Todd Motors)

Body and chassis
- Body style: 4-door sedan 5-door station wagon
- Layout: FR layout
- Related: Plymouth Valiant

Powertrain
- Engine: 225 cu in (3.7 L) I6
- Transmission: 3-speed manual 3-speed automatic

Dimensions
- Wheelbase: 106.0 inches (2692 mm)
- Length: 185.4 inches (4709 mm)
- Width: 69.0 inches (1753 mm)
- Height: 55.0 inches (1387 mm)
- Kerb weight: 2679 lb (1213 kg)

Chronology
- Predecessor: Chrysler SV1 Valiant
- Successor: Chrysler AP6 Valiant

The Chrysler AP5 Valiant is an automobile produced by Chrysler Australia from 1963 until 1965. It was the third Chrysler Valiant model to be produced in Australia.

== Overview ==
The AP5 Valiant was released in May 1963, replacing the SV1 Valiant. It was the first Valiant model to be manufactured in Australia rather than just assembled there. Based on the 1963 Plymouth Valiant, the AP5 featured entirely new sheet-metal, with most body panels produced in Australia. While the front fenders were the same as the U.S Valiant, the front of the Australian model had a six-bar grille that stretched from headlight to headlight. The Australian version had a larger boot with a different rear deck and a flat rear window. The 225 cid slant six engine was carried over from the SV1 model and remained fully imported. Suspension was substantially unchanged but employed softer rear springs. Unlike the United States, no 2-door hardtop or convertibles were produced in Australia.

The AP5 range was increased to include the upmarket Valiant Regal which featured different badgework, better seats and interior trim, auto transmission as standard, a heater with integrated demister, carpets and white-wall tyres. In November 1963, Safari and Regal Safari station wagons were added to the range. The wagons shared mechanical components and front styling with the sedans and were fitted with heavier rear springs. U.S Plymouth Valiant wagon rear sheetmetal was used, resulting in different rear end styling depending on production dates. Early build AP5 wagons used 1963 Plymouth Valiant wagon horizontal style tail lights while later build wagons used 1964 Plymouth Valiant wagon vertical style tail lights. Both versions incorporated amber turn signals to comply with Australian regulations.

The AP5 was marketed by Chrysler Australia as the "Valiant by Chrysler" rather than as the Chrysler Valiant.

== Model range ==
The AP5 Valiant was offered with 4-door sedan and 5-door station wagon body styles in six models.

- Valiant manual sedan (AP5-2)
- Valiant automatic sedan (AP5-4)
- Valiant Regal sedan (AP5-4H)
- Valiant Safari manual wagon (AP5-2W)
- Valiant Safari automatic wagon (AP5-4W)
- Valiant Regal Safari wagon (AP5-4WH)

The sedans were introduced in May 1963 and the wagons in November 1963.

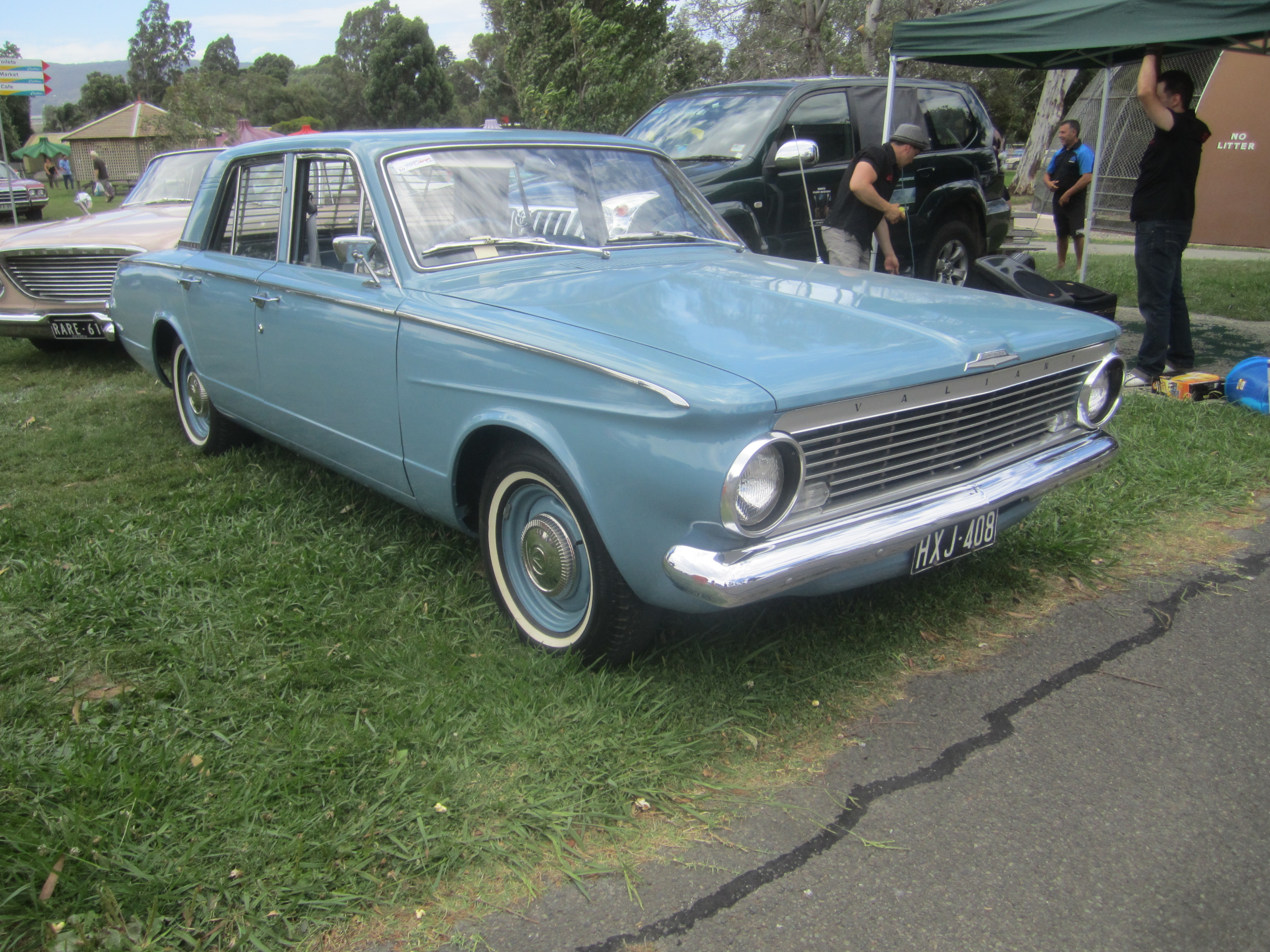
Chrysler Valiant AP5 sedan

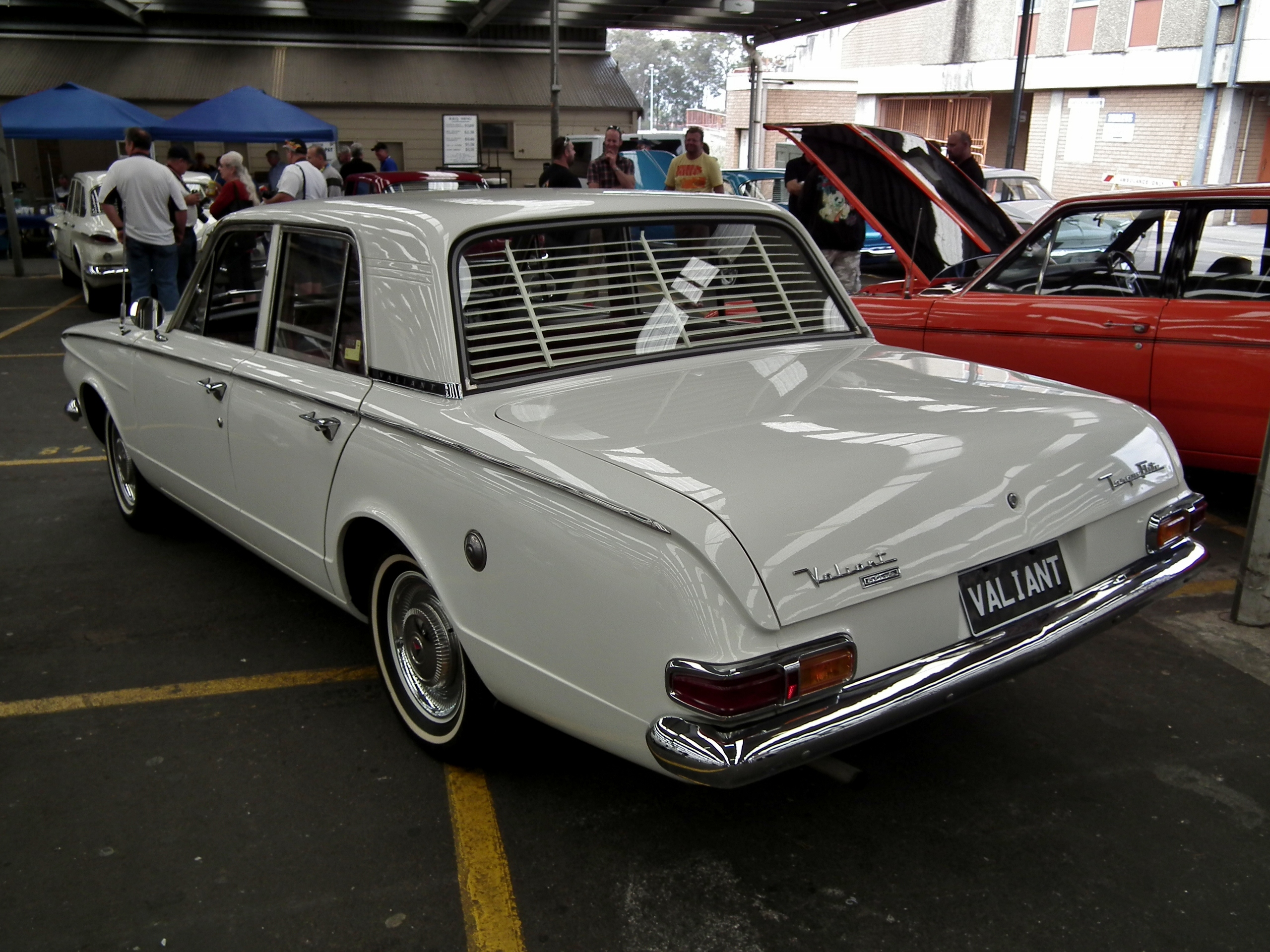
Chrysler AP5 Valiant sedan

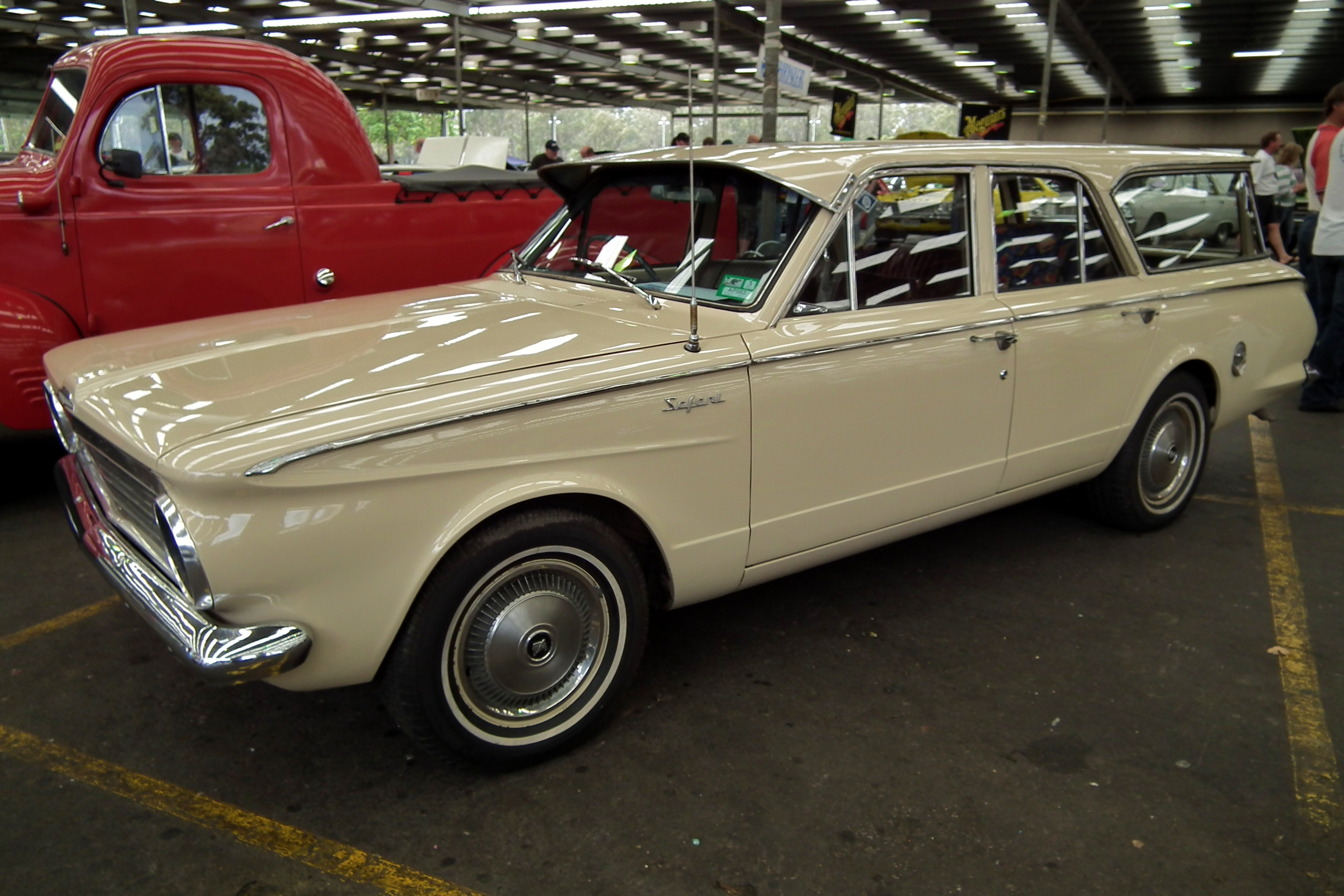
Chrysler AP5 Valiant Safari wagon (later model hubcaps)

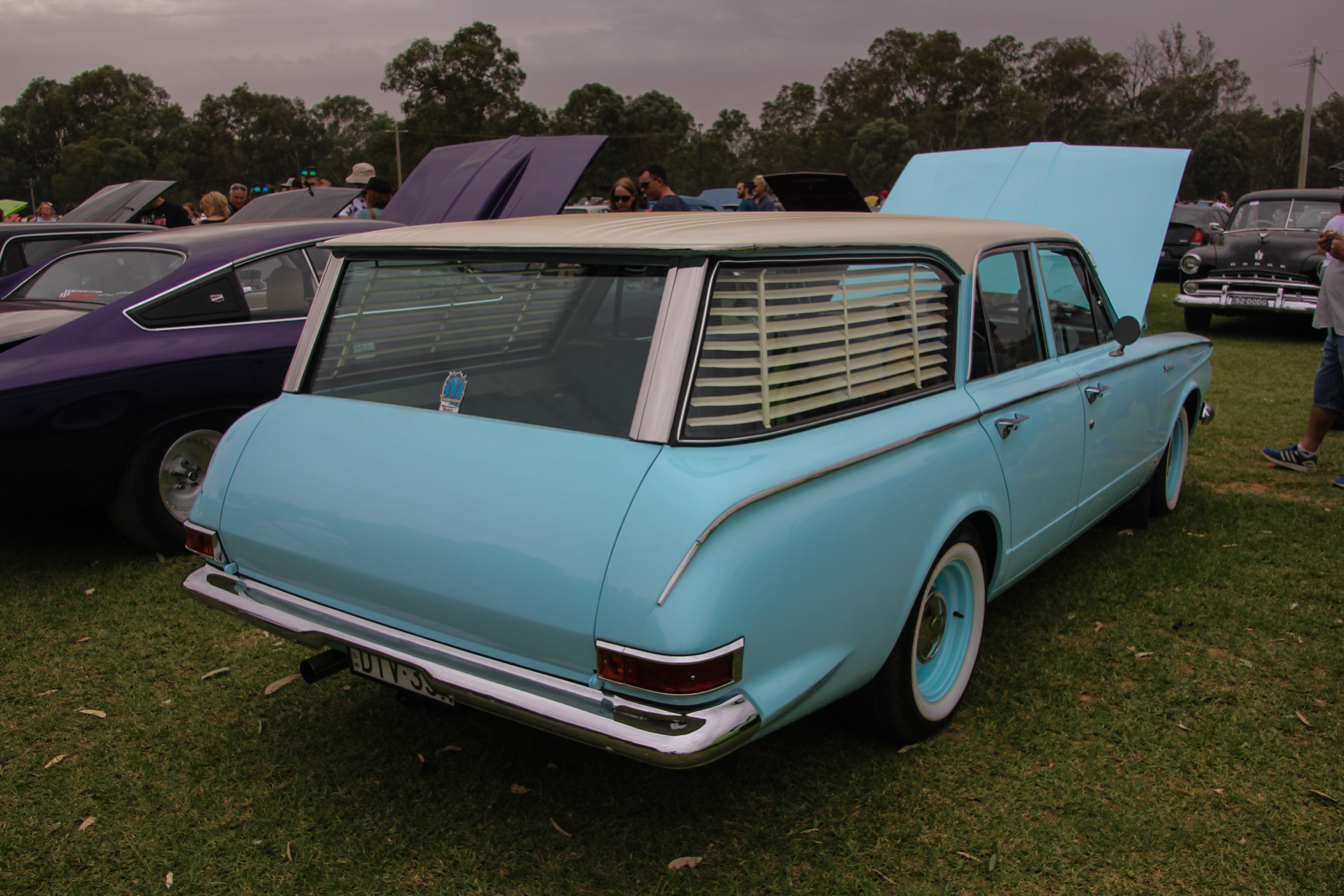
Chrysler AP5 Valiant Safari wagon - early build version using US 1963 Plymouth Valiant horizontal style tail lights. Note amber turn signal lenses incorporated to comply with Australian regulations

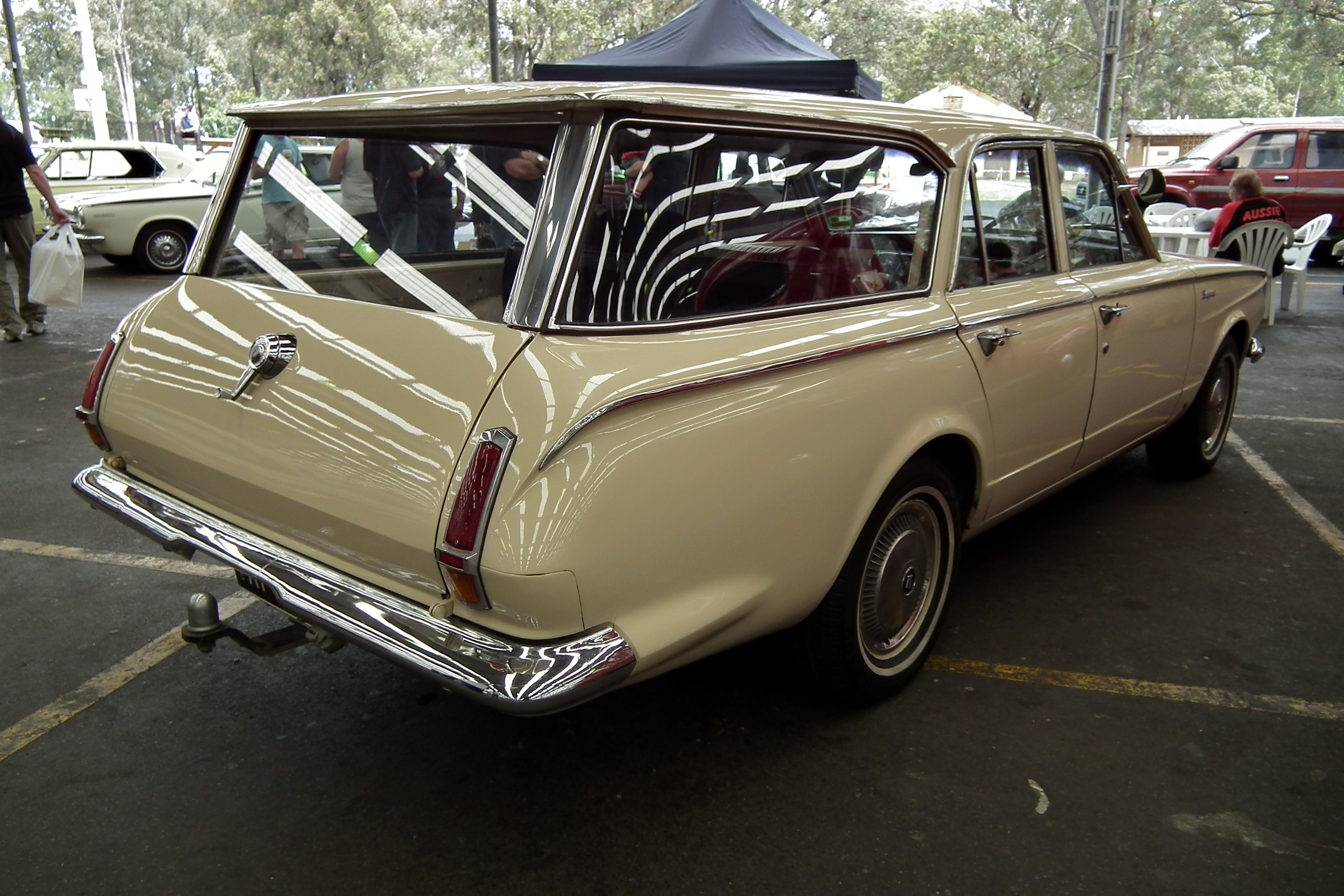
Chrysler AP5 Valiant Safari wagon - later build version using US 1964 Plymouth Valiant vertical style tail lights with amber turn signals

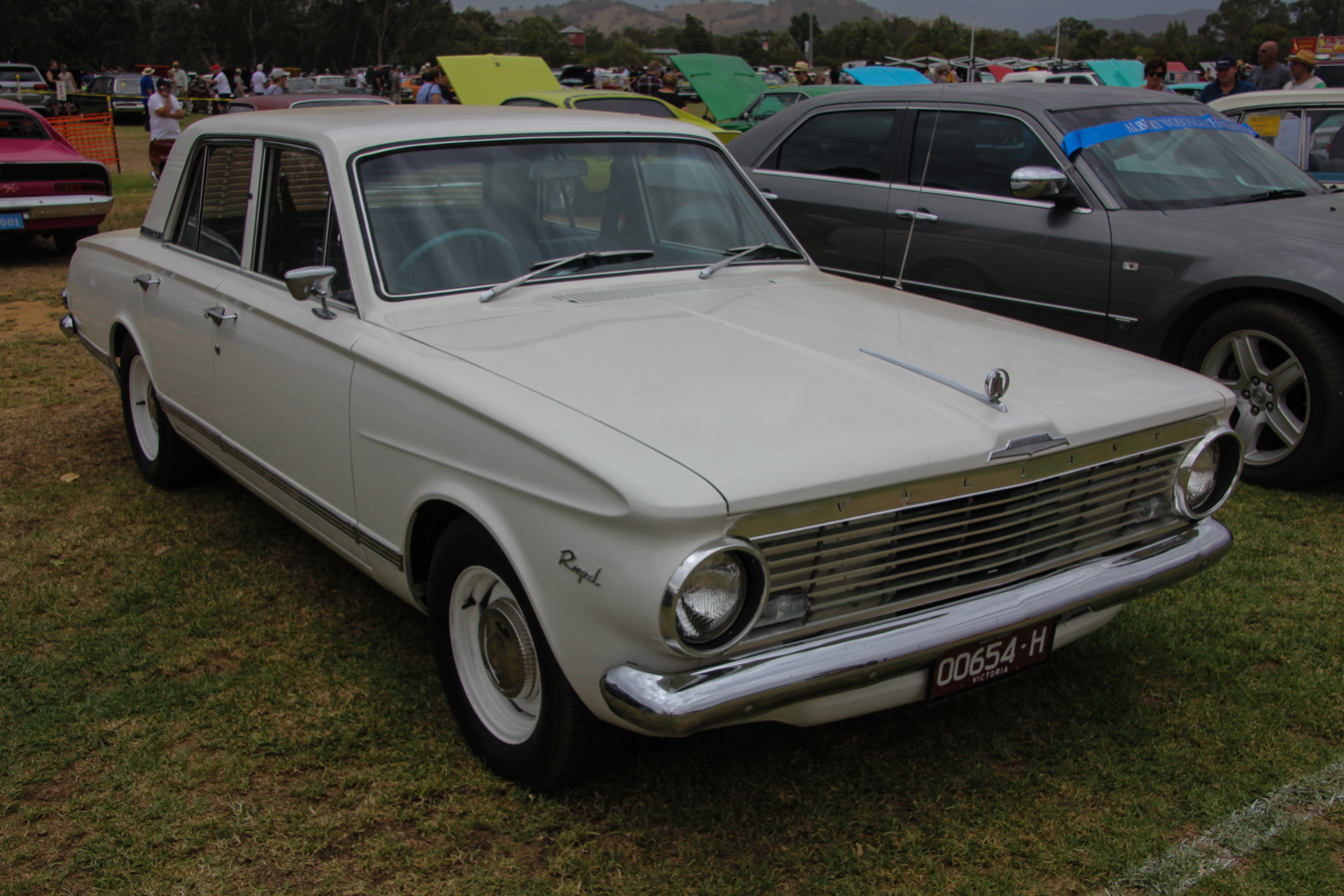
Chrysler AP5 Valiant Regal sedan

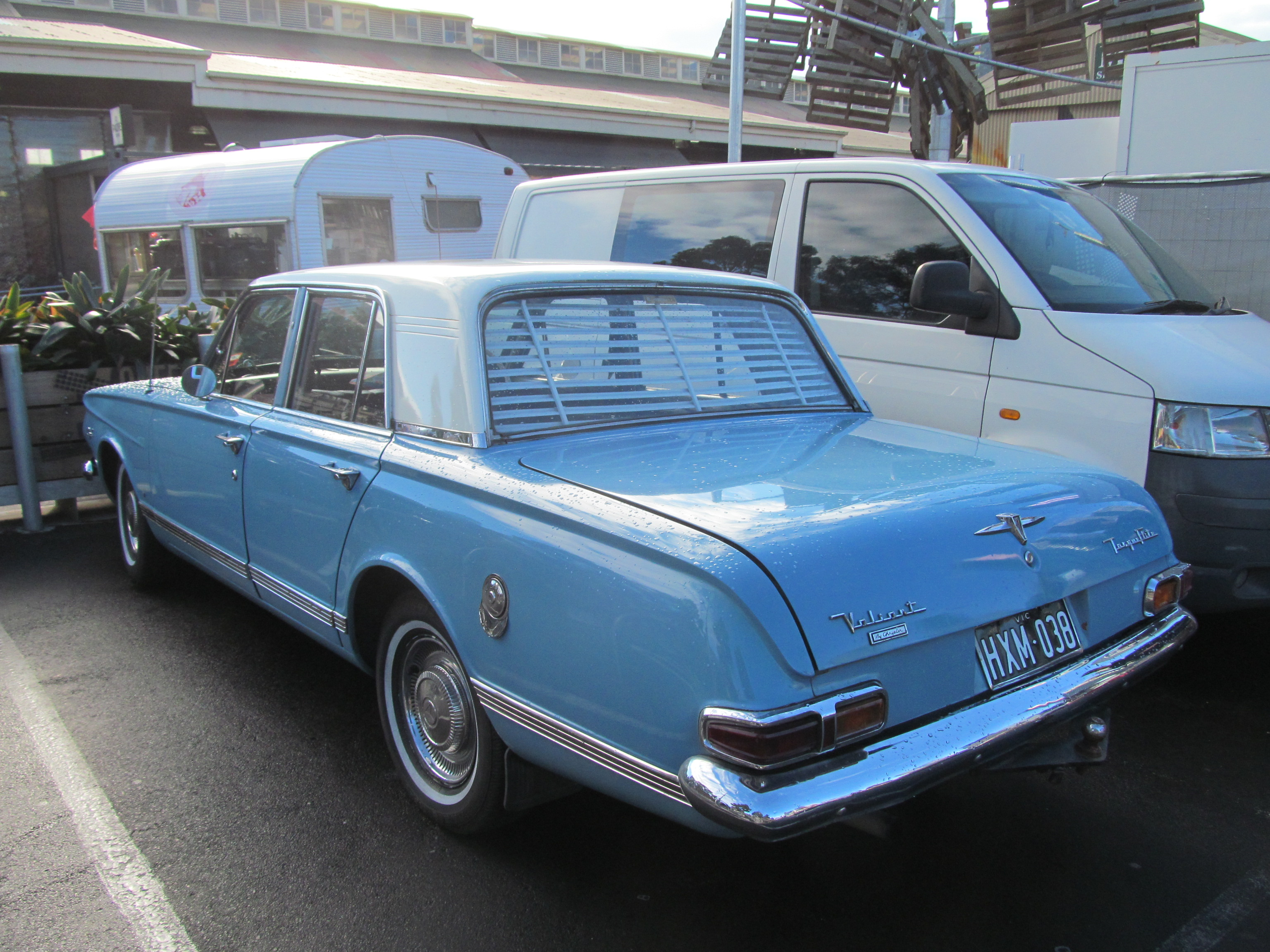
Chrysler AP5 Valiant Regal sedan

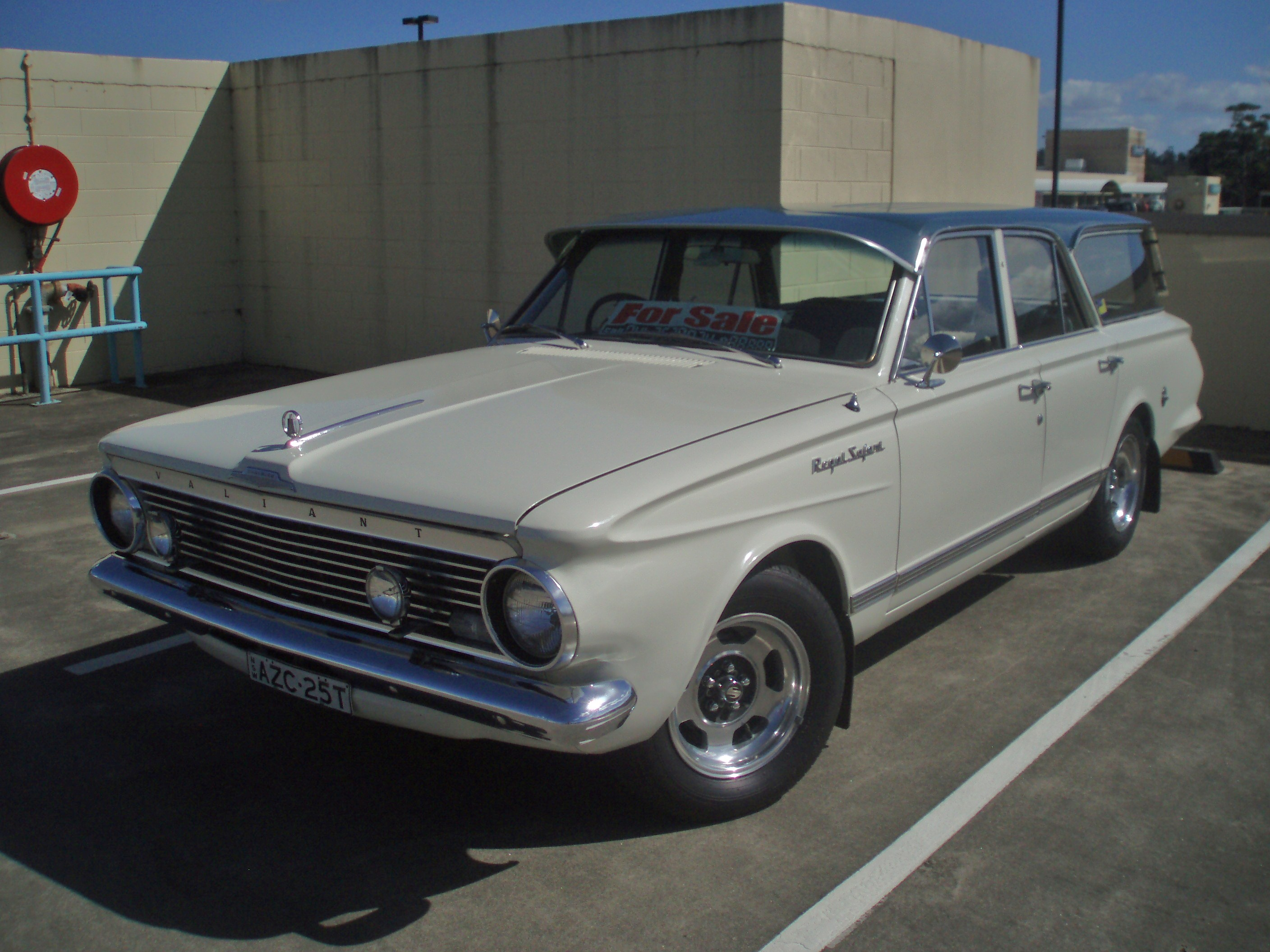
Chrysler AP5 Valiant Regal Safari wagon

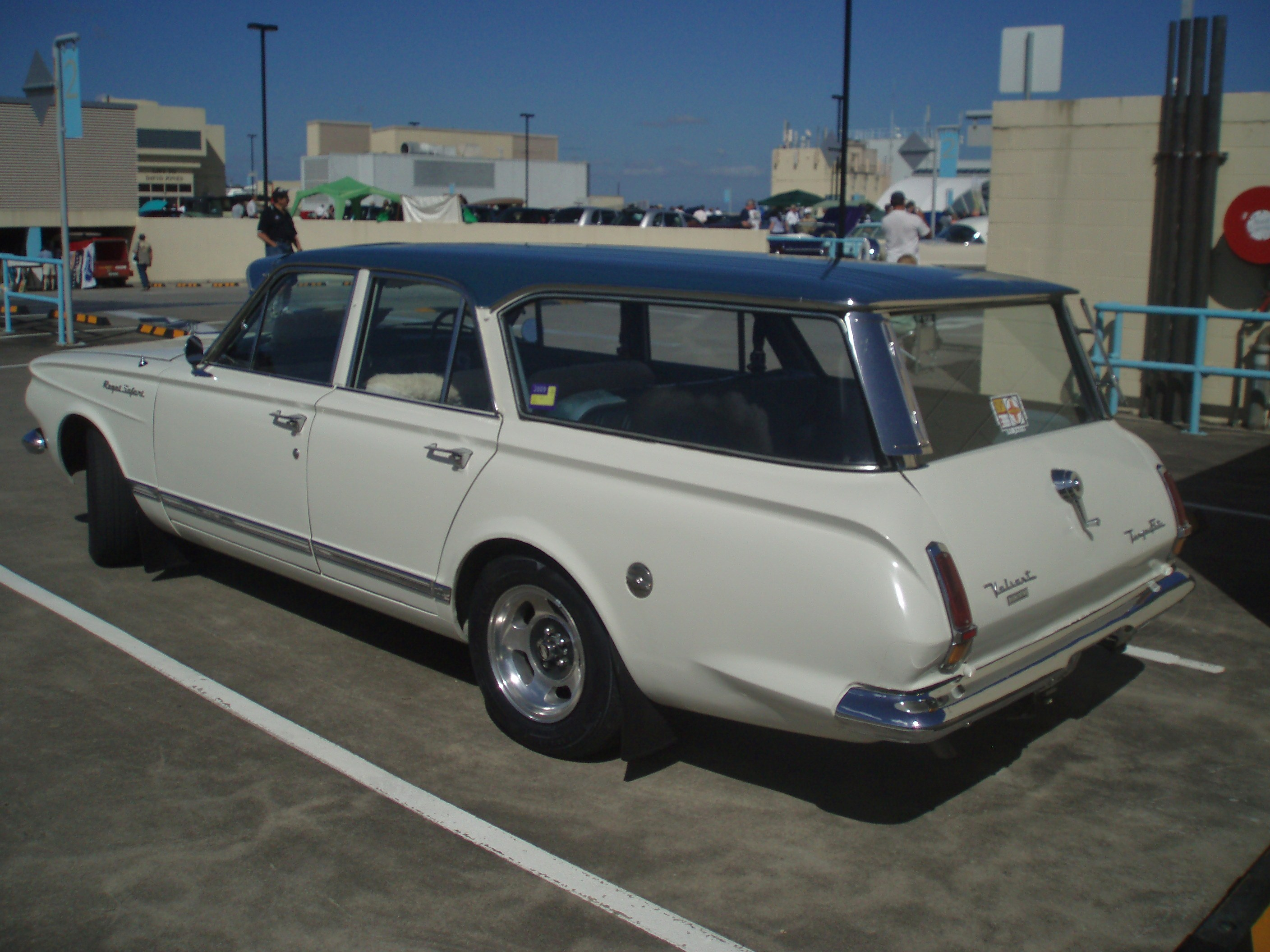
Chrysler AP5 Valiant Regal Safari wagon

== Engines and transmissions ==
A 225 cu in (3.7 L) Straight-six engine was fitted to all models. Three-speed manual and three-speed "TorqueFlite" push button operated automatic transmissions were offered, with the latter fitted as standard on Regal models.

== Production and replacement ==
A total of 49,440 AP5 Valiants were built prior to its replacement by the AP6 Valiant in February 1965. Of this total, 37,292 were sedans and 12,148 were wagons.

== Motorsport ==
An AP5 Valiant driven by Tony Reynolds and Tony Allen won Class D in the 1963 Armstrong 500 endurance race at Mount Panorama, Bathurst.
