= Chrysler Valiant (AP6) =

Australian full-size car

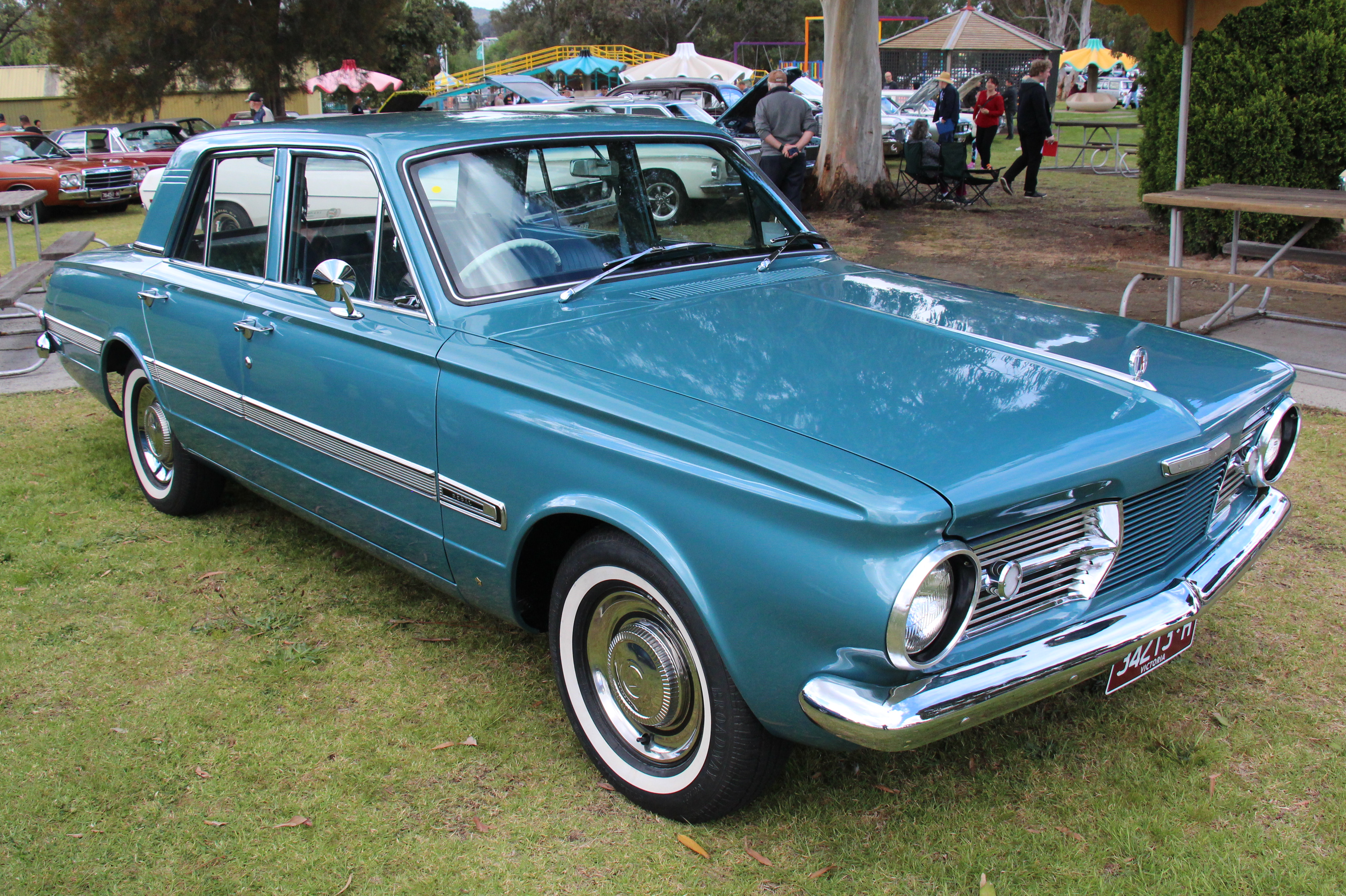
- Chrysler Valiant Regal sedan

Overview
- Manufacturer: Chrysler Australia
- Production: February 1965 – March 1966; 43,344 produced
- Assembly: Australia: Tonsley Park; New Zealand: Petone (Todd Motors)

Body and chassis
- Body style: 4-door sedan 5-door station wagon 2-door coupé utility
- Layout: FR layout
- Related: Plymouth Valiant

Powertrain
- Engine: 225 cu in (3.7 L) I6; 273 cu in (4.5 L) V8
- Transmission: 3-speed manual 3-speed automatic

Dimensions
- Wheelbase: 106.0 inches (2692 mm)
- Length: 187.9 inches (4772 mm) (sedan)
- Width: 69.0 inches (1753 mm)
- Height: 55.0 inches (1387 mm)
- Kerb weight: 2744 lb (1245 kg)

Chronology
- Predecessor: Chrysler Valiant (AP5)
- Successor: Chrysler Valiant (VC)

The Chrysler Valiant AP6 is an automobile which was produced by Chrysler Australia from 1965 to 1966. It was the fourth Chrysler Valiant model produced in Australia.

== Overview ==
The Valiant AP6 was released in March 1965, replacing the Chrysler Valiant AP5. The Australian model was based on the 1965 Plymouth Valiant with local style modifications carried over from the AP5. As with the U.S model, the AP6 had a new split grille, a new bonnet and new front mudguards. Whereas the U.S Valiant had its turn signals in the beaver panel (beneath the grille), the AP6 had its turn signals integrated into the grille. Mechanical changes included a redesigned camshaft, the introduction of self-adjusting brakes and the replacement of the push button gear selector on models with automatic transmission by a traditional lever system. Optional power brakes were made available across the range.

A coupe utility variant was added to the range in April 1965 and marketed as the Valiant Wayfarer. This was the first Valiant-based coupe utility to be produced by Chrysler Australia.

As with the previous AP5 model, station wagon rear styling varied depending on production dates. Early build wagons used 1965 US Plymouth Valiant wagon-style tail lights. At some time in the production run Chrysler Australia invested in new tooling for the wagon rear sheet metal, allowing the use of sedan rear doors. Later style wagons again used vertical style tail lights. The new pressings required revised rear cargo area side windows and rear bumpers were also redesigned. Changes occurred from build number AP6-2W-3107 (manual Safari), AP6-4W-2167 (automatic Safari), AP6-4HW-1418 (Regal Safari) and AP6-4WHV-209 (V8 Safari). The difference in sheet metal is most notable where the rear bumpers on the later versions finish. On early build cars the rear bumper ends lead into a pressing on the lower rear quarter panel sheet metal, whereas on later build cars the bumper has curved ends with a flat sheet metal surface on the lower rear quarters.

Valiant V8 models were released in August 1965. A V8 sedan and V8 Safari wagon were offered, both powered by a 273 cu in (4.5 L) V8 engine with “TorqueFlite 8” automatic transmission. V8 models could be identified by V8 badges, with the V8 sedan having a vinyl roof and the V8 Safari wagon being fitted with a roof rack. Power-assisted brakes were standard equipment. Although it utilized Regal trim and equipment, the V8 was marketed as the Valiant V8, not as a Valiant Regal V8.

== Model range ==
The Valiant AP6 was offered in 4-door sedan, 5-door station wagon and 2-door coupé utility body styles in ten models.

- Valiant manual sedan (AP6-2)
- Valiant automatic sedan (AP6-4)
- Valiant Regal sedan (AP6-4H)
- Valiant V8 sedan (AP6-4PV)
- Valiant Safari manual wagon (AP6-2W)
- Valiant Safari automatic wagon (AP6-4W)
- Valiant Regal Safari wagon (AP6-4WH)
- Valiant V8 Safari wagon (AP6-4WHV)
- Valiant Wayfarer manual utility (AP6-2U)
- Valiant Wayfarer automatic utility (AP6-4U)
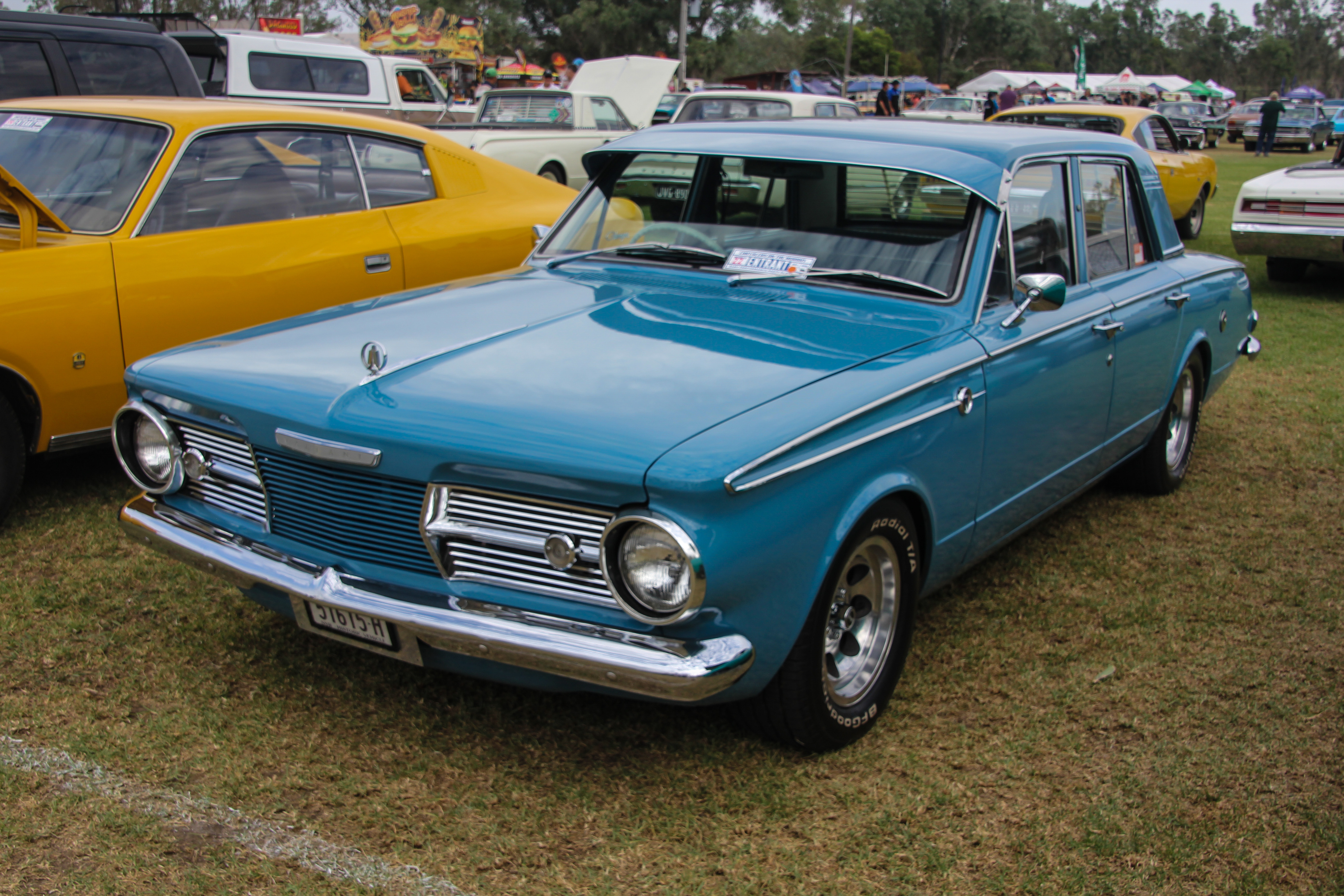
Chrysler AP6 Valiant sedan (with aftermarket wheels)

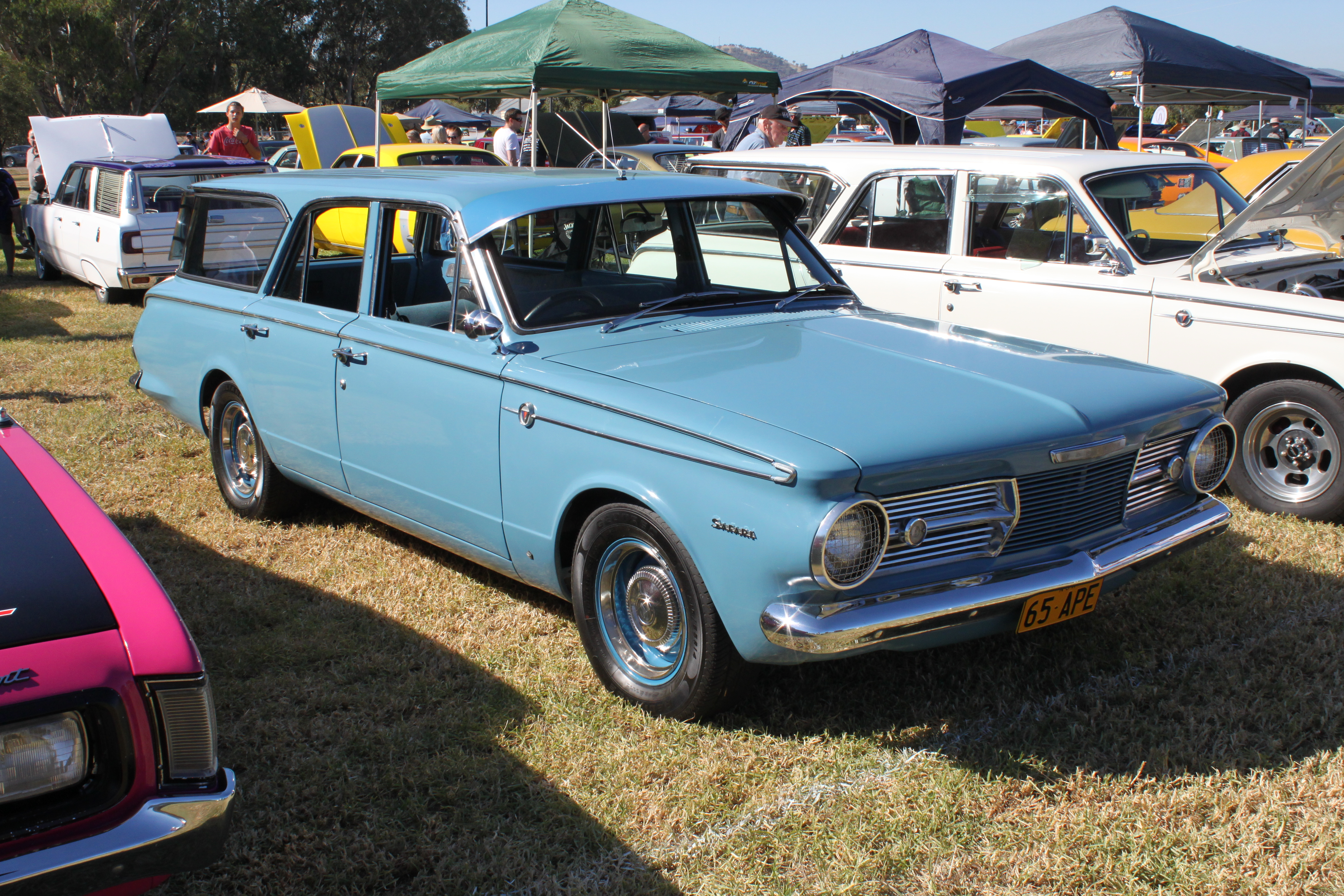
Chrysler AP6 Valiant Safari wagon

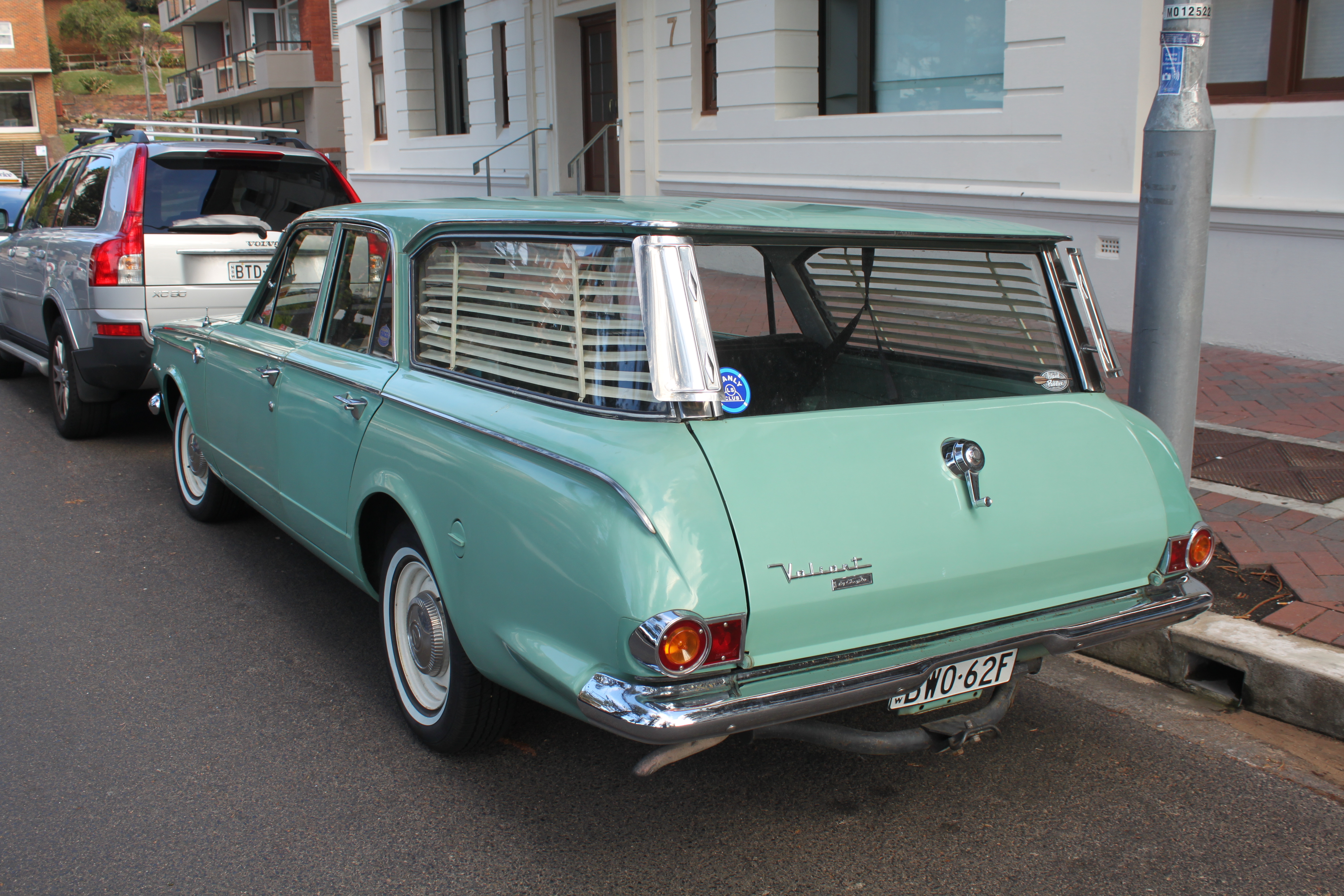
Chrysler AP6 Valiant Safari wagon - early build. Note US 1965 Plymouth Valiant wagon style tail lights with amber turn signals, and rear bumper ends that finish against pressing in lower body panel.

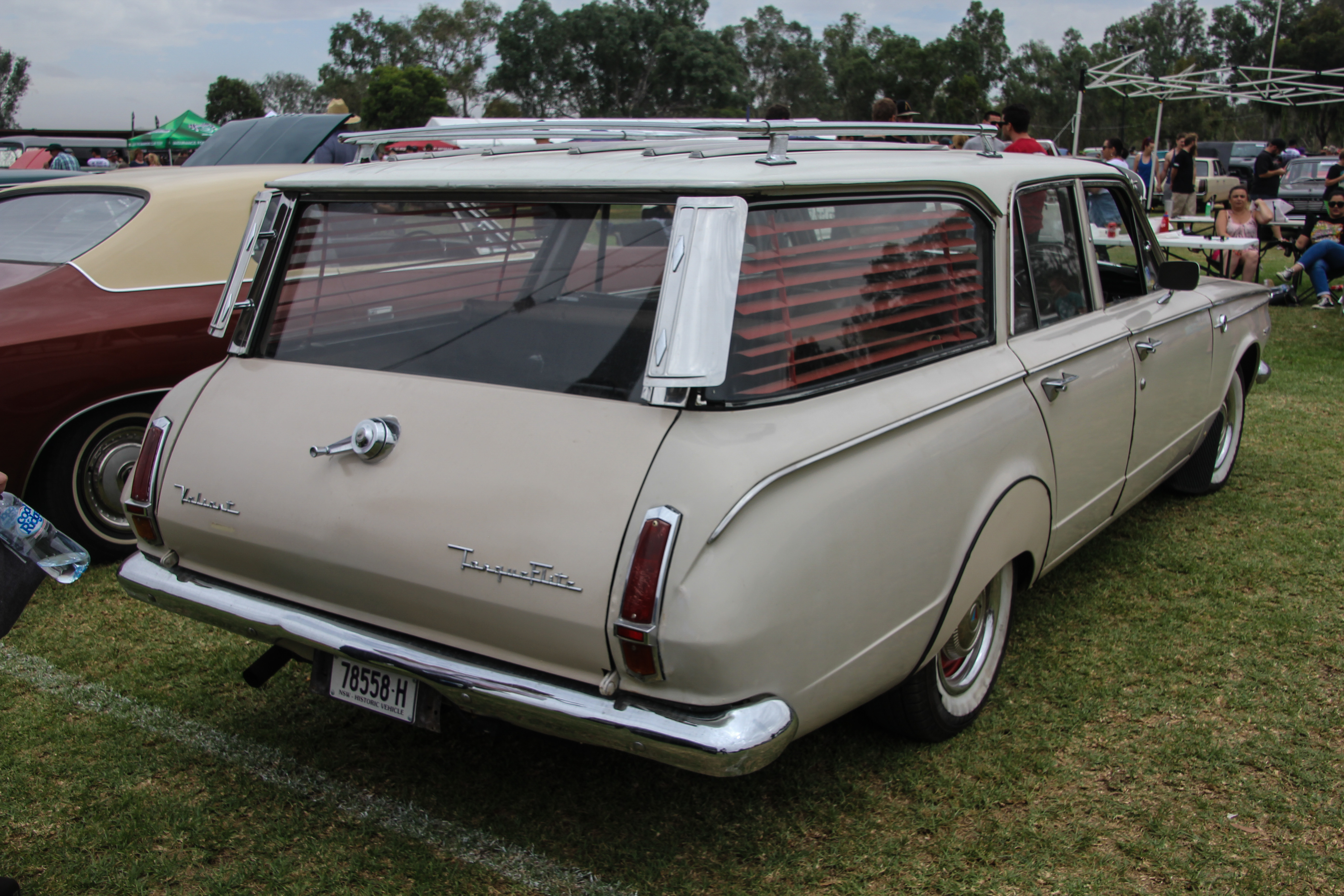
Chrysler AP6 Valiant Safari wagon - later build. Note vertical style tail lights and rear bumper with curved ends that finish against flat body panel. Later build wagons also used sedan rear doors, necessitating revised shaping of rear cargo area side glass, and body trim.

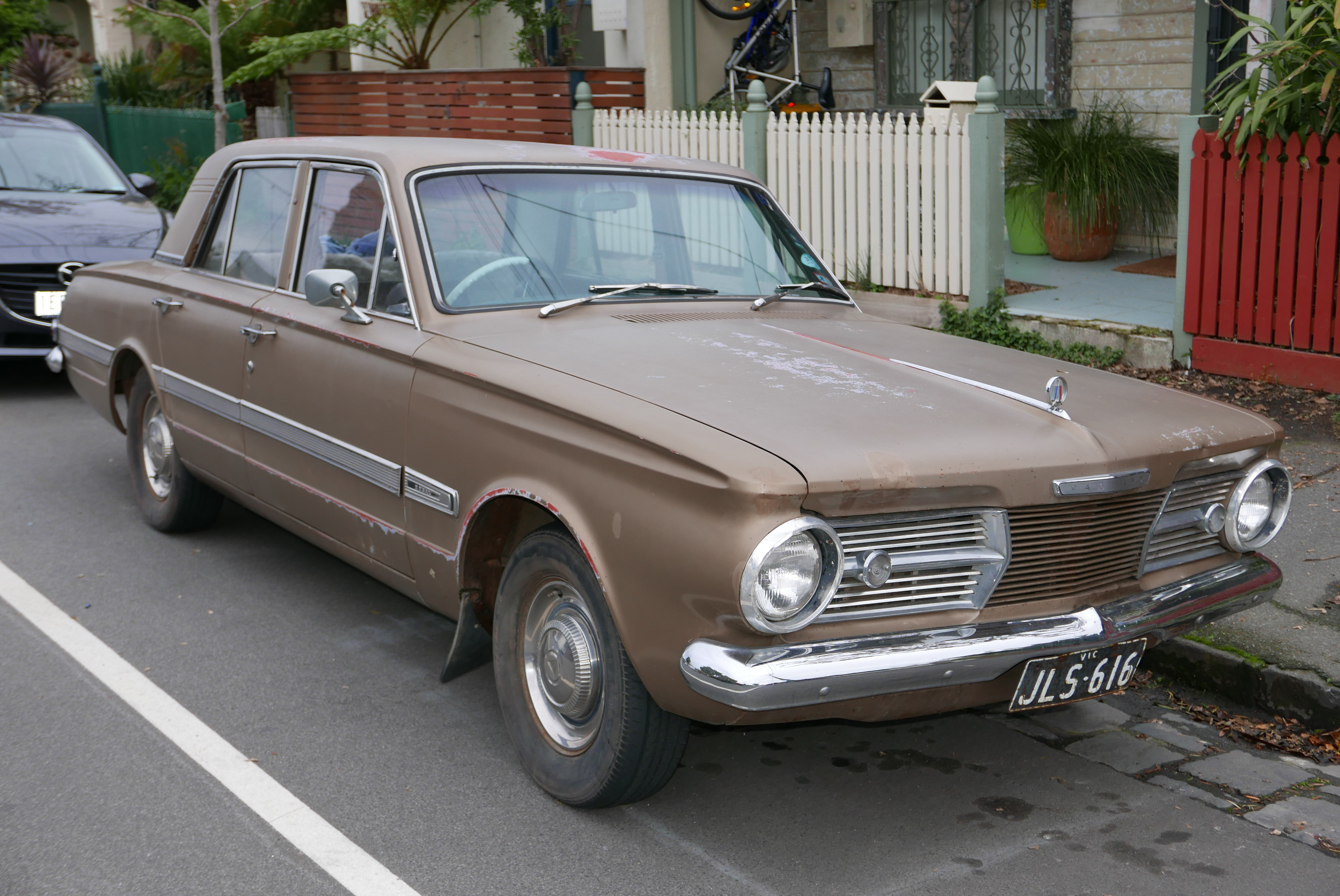
Chrysler AP6 Valiant Regal sedan

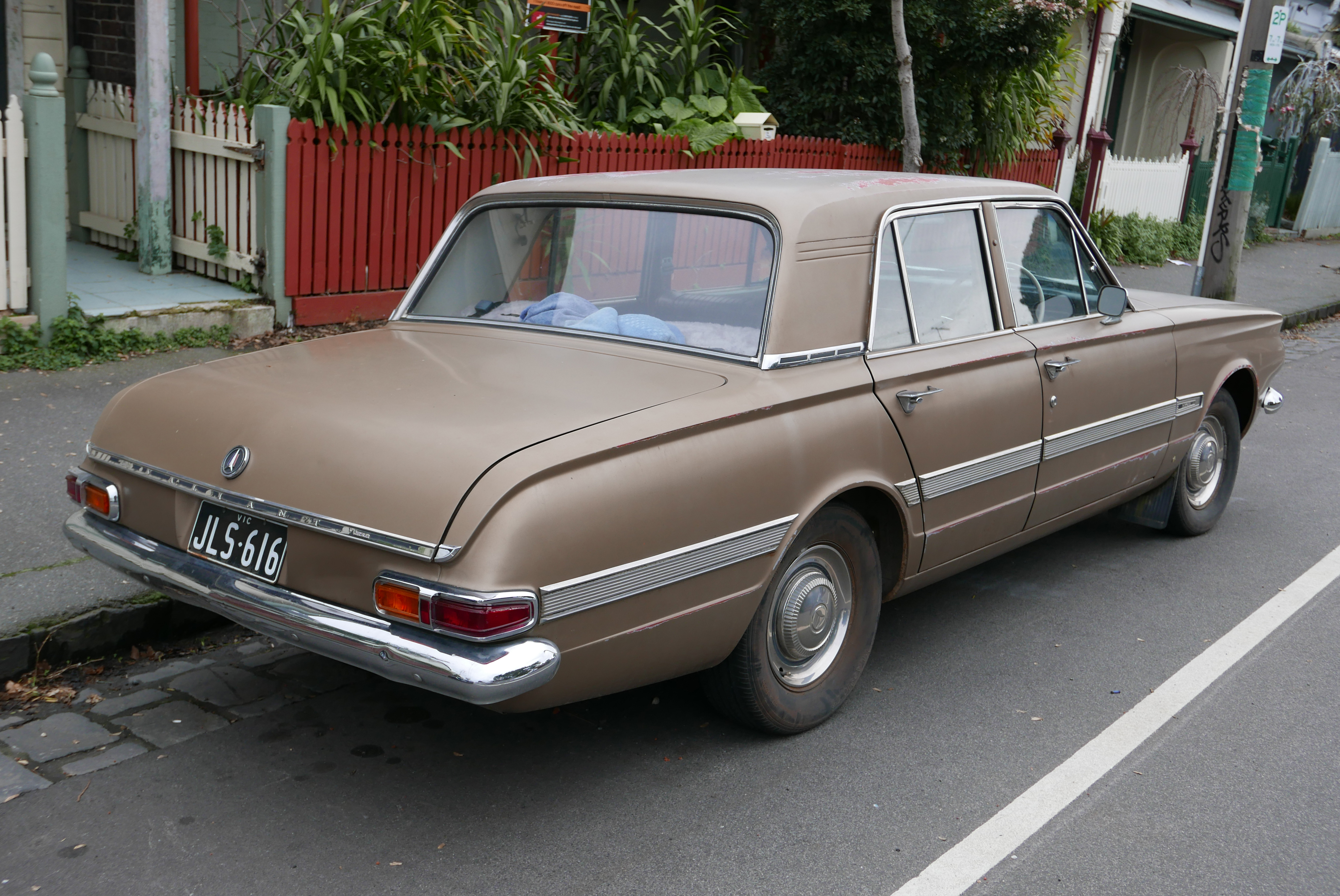
Chrysler AP6 Valiant Regal sedan

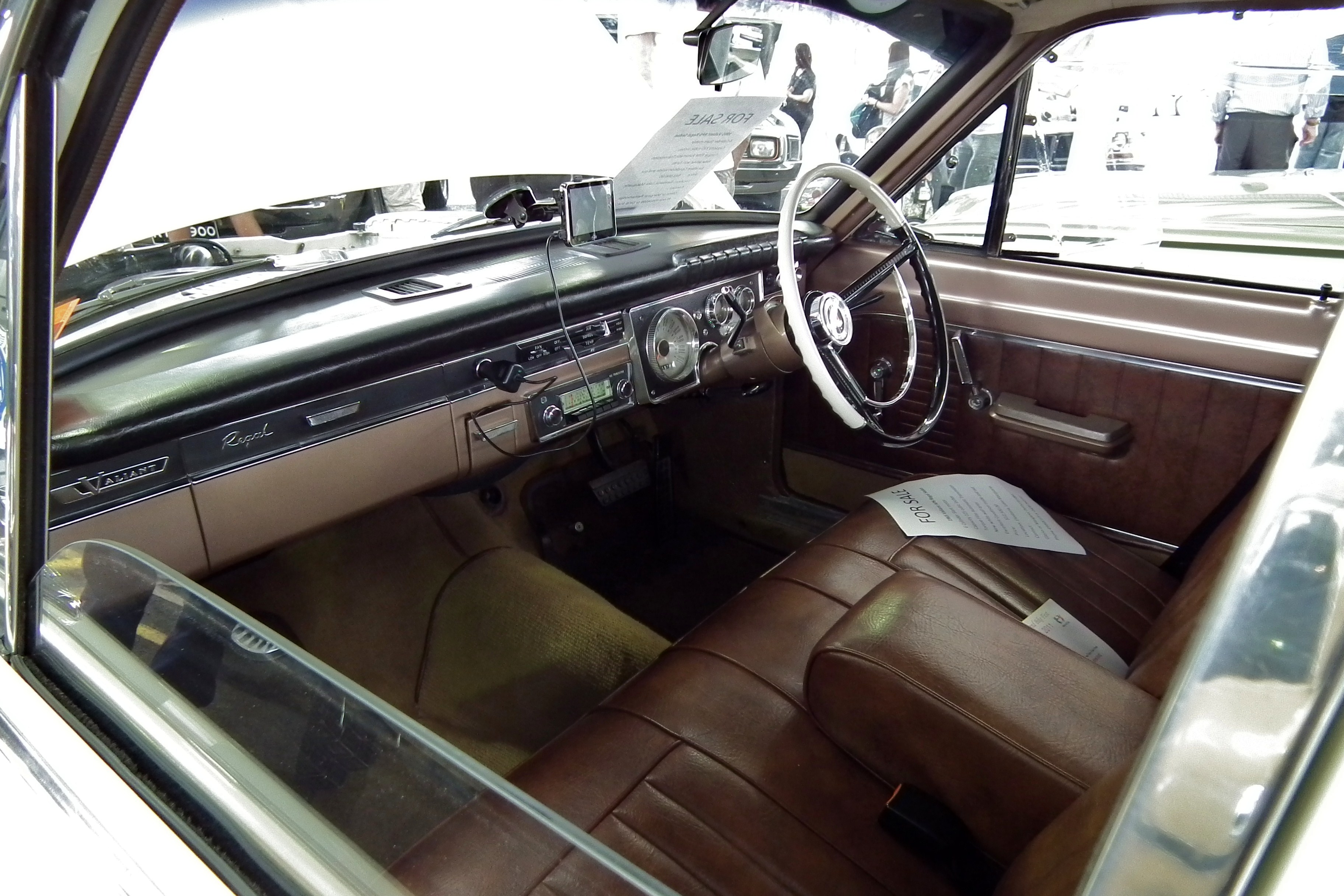
Chrysler AP6 Valiant Regal sedan interior

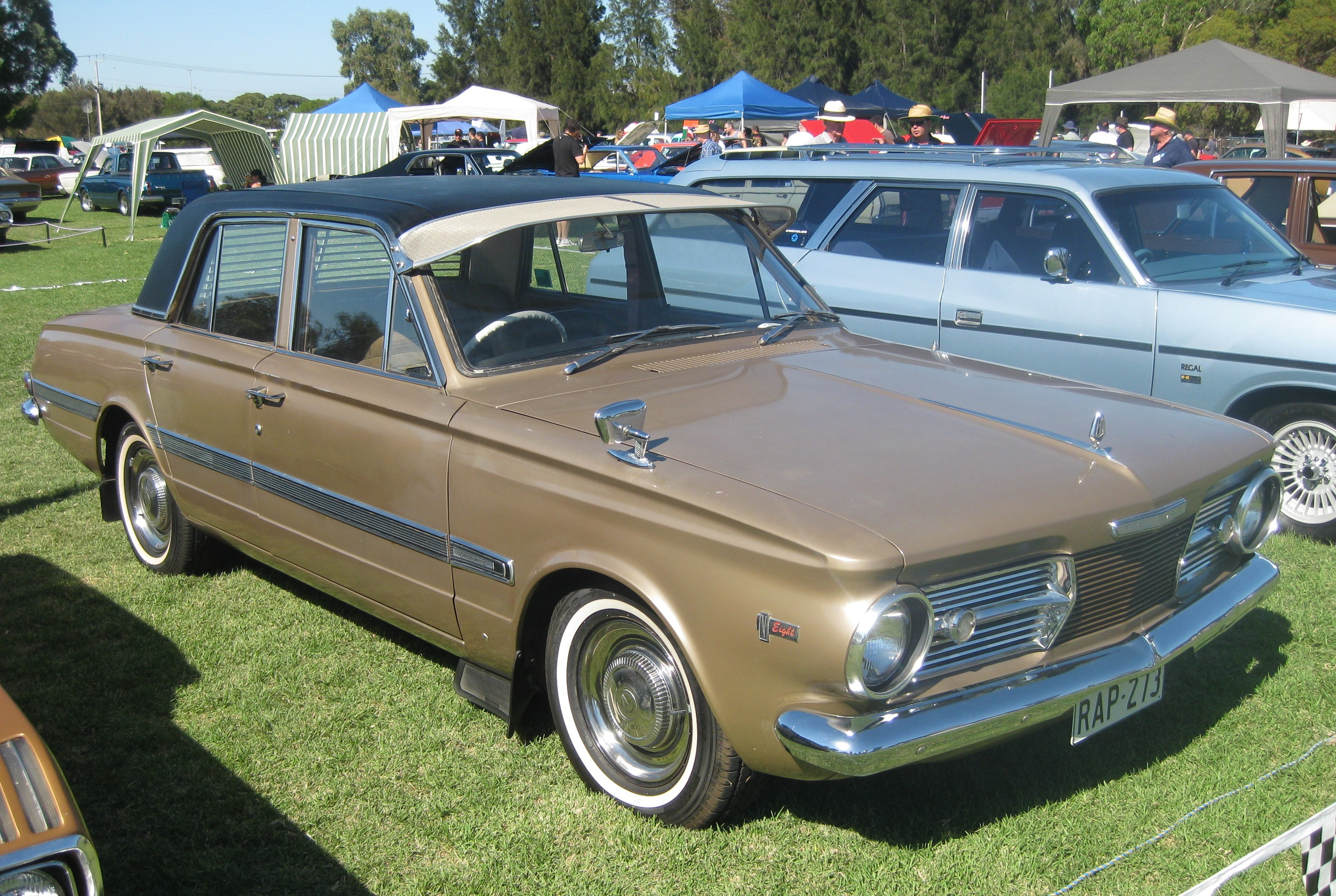
Chrysler AP6 Valiant V8 sedan

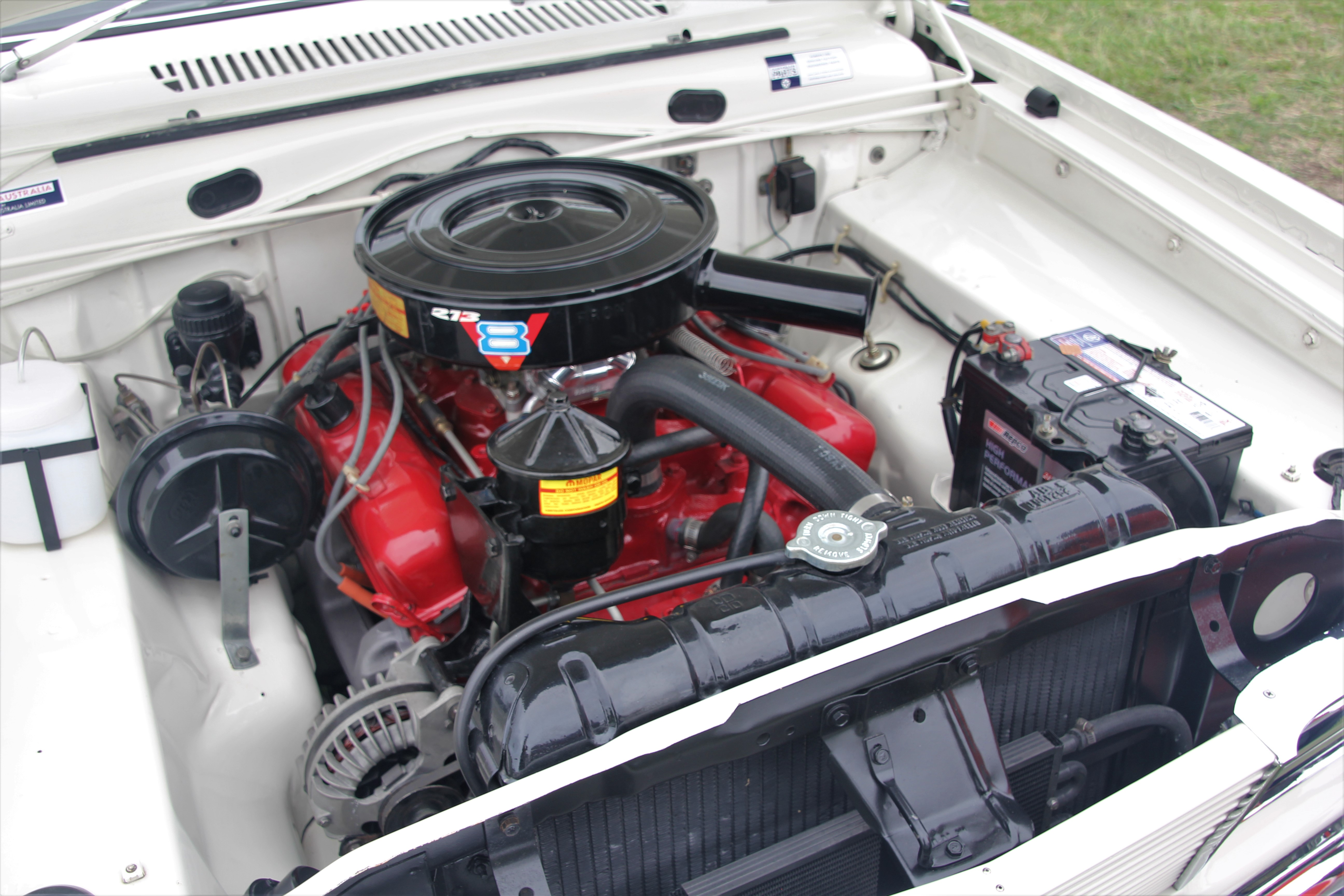
273 cubic inch V8 engine as fitted to Chrysler AP6 Valiant V8

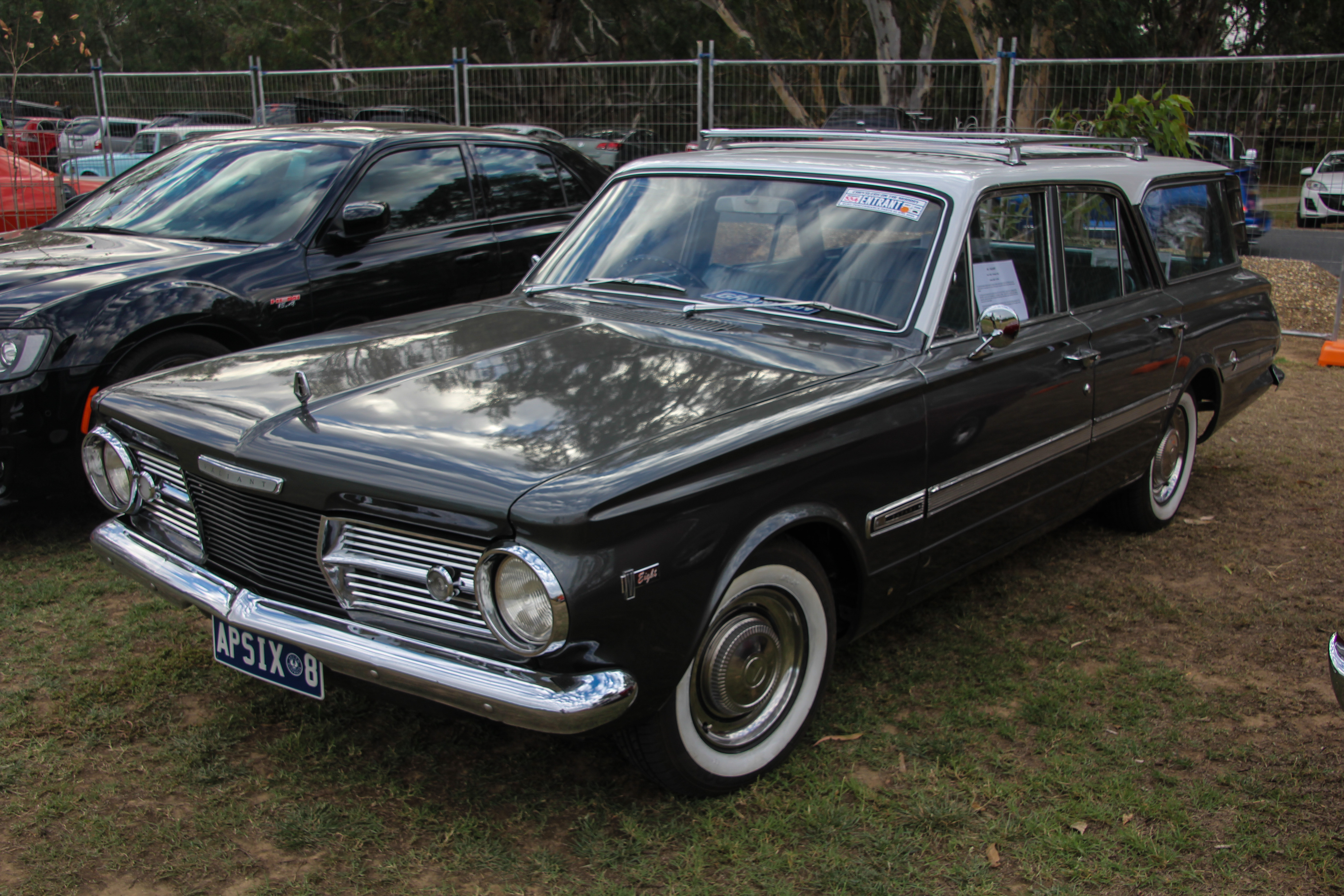
Chrysler AP6 Valiant V8 Safari wagon

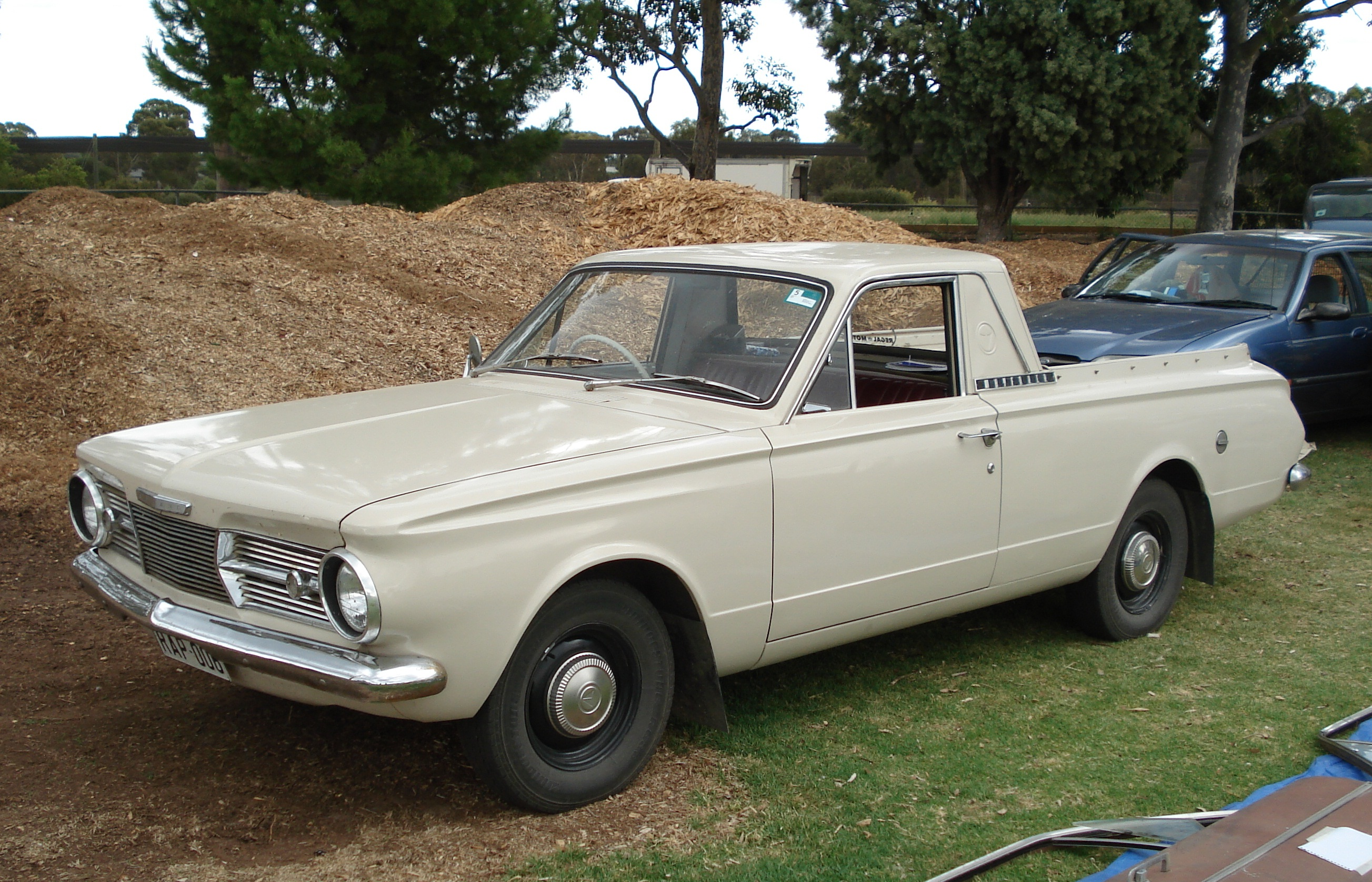
Chrysler AP6 Valiant Wayfarer utility

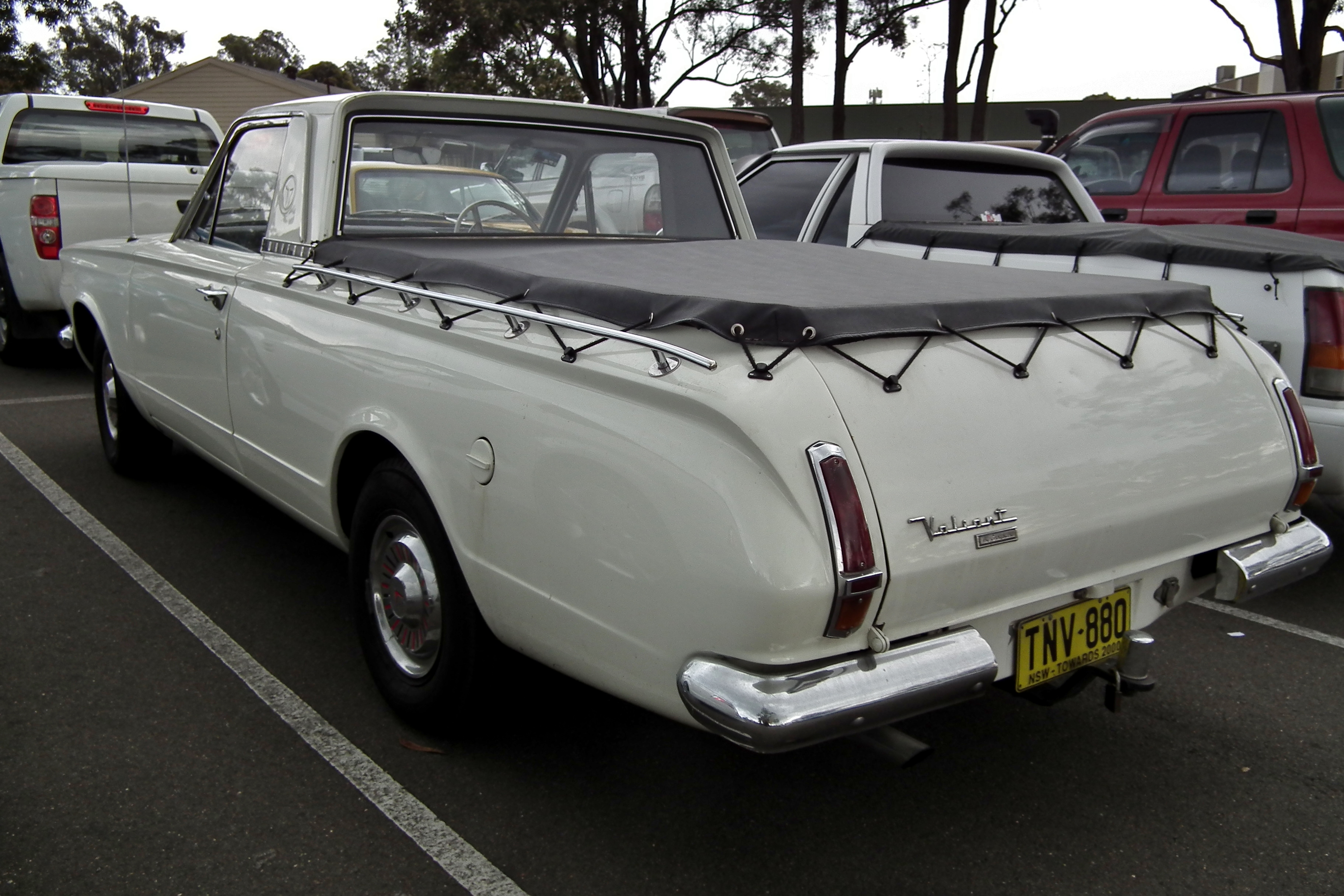
Chrysler AP6 Valiant Wayfarer utility

== Engines and transmissions ==
A 225 cu in (3.7 L) Straight-six engine was fitted to all models except the Valiant V8, which was powered by a 273 cu in (4.5 L) V8 engine. Three speed manual and three speed automatic transmissions were offered.

== Production and replacement ==
A total of 43,344 Valiant AP6s were produced prior to its replacement by the Valiant VC in 1966.
