= Chrysler VIP =

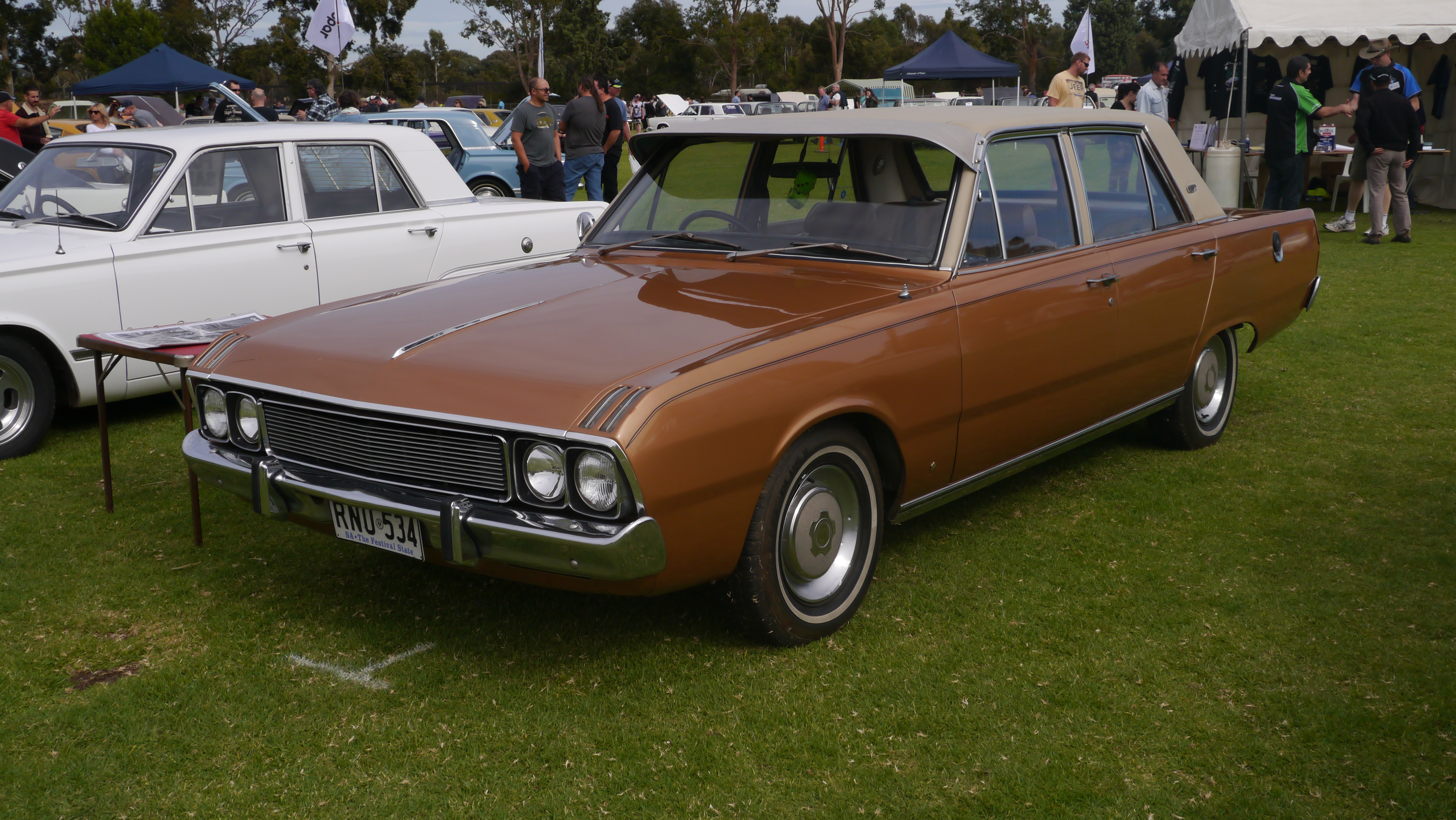
- Chrysler VG VIP

Overview
- Manufacturer: Chrysler Australia
- Also called: VIP by Chrysler
- Production: May 1969 – October 1971
- Assembly: Australia: Tonsley Park

Body and chassis
- Body style: 4-door sedan
- Layout: FR layout
- Platform: Chrysler A platform
- Related: Chrysler Valiant

Powertrain
- Engine: 225 cu in (3.7 L) Slant-6; 245 cu in (4.0 L) Hemi-6; 318 cu in (5.2 L) LA V8
- Transmission: 3-speed automatic

Dimensions
- Wheelbase: 112 inches (2845 mm)
- Length: 196.3 inches (4986 mm)
- Height: 57.0 inches (1448 mm)
- Curb weight: VF VIP V8: 3250 lb (1474 kg)

Chronology
- Predecessor: Chrysler VE Valiant V.I.P.
- Successor: Chrysler by Chrysler

The Chrysler VIP is an automobile which was produced by Chrysler Australia from 1969 to 1971. It is an extended wheelbase, luxury variant of the Australian developed Chrysler Valiant.

== Chrysler VE Valiant V.I.P. ==
Prior to the introduction of the Chrysler VIP, Chrysler Australia had used the VIP name on the Chrysler Valiant V.I.P., introduced in 1967 as the top model in its Valiant VE Series range. The Valiant V.I.P. was offered in both 4 door sedan and Safari station wagon body styles and was fitted with a 273 cu in (4.5 L) V8 engine. The VE Valiant V.I.P. replaced the outgoing top of the range VC Valiant V8, however with the V8 engine now optional across the VE model range and no longer reserved for the top specification, the change of name was instigated. VE VIP sedans and wagons used the same three horizontal chrome stripes on the rear guards as the VC Valiant V8 sedan.

Power disc brakes and power assisted steering were standard equipment on both body styles of the VE VIP. Additionally the Safari station wagon received an electrically operated tailgate window.

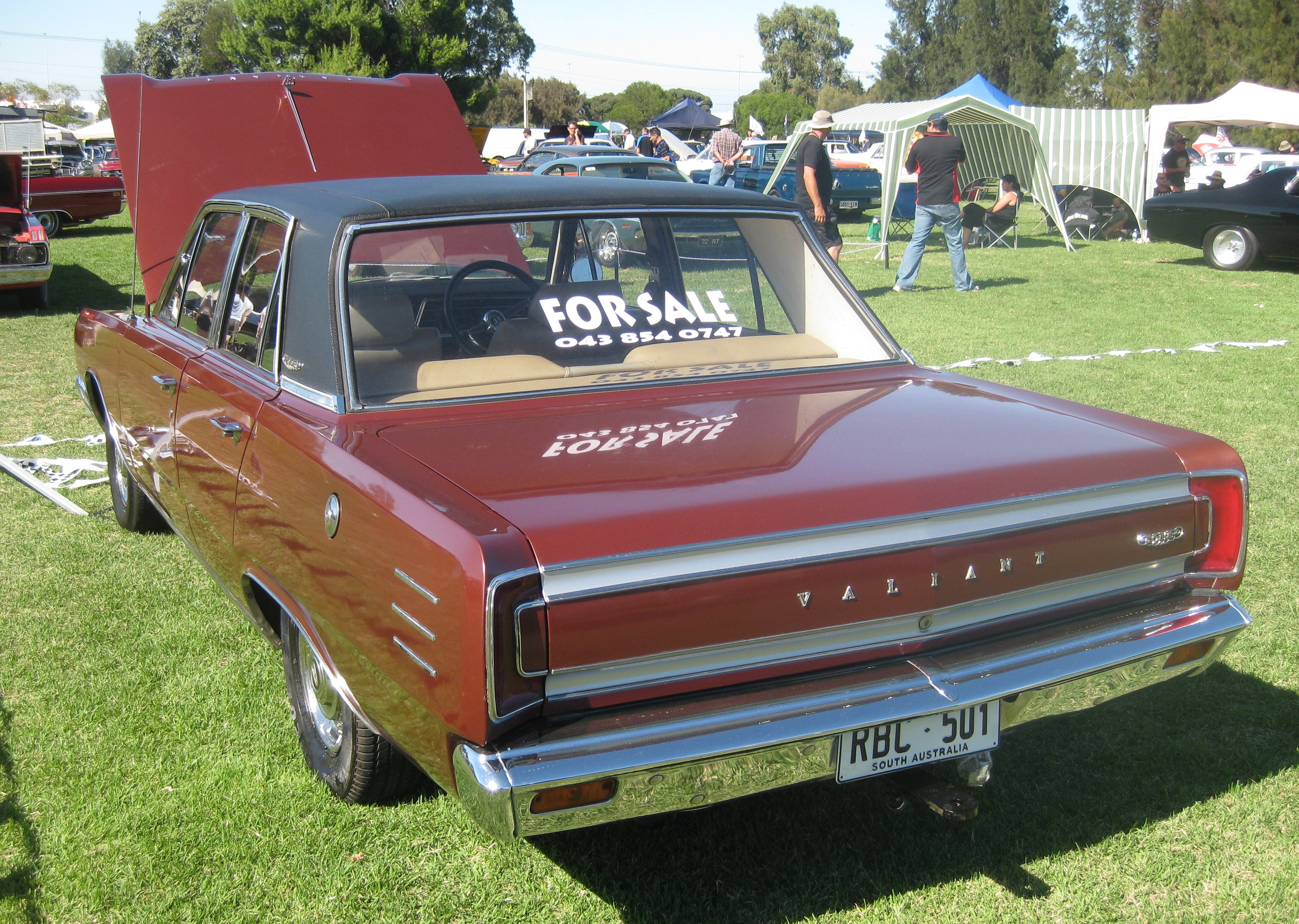
Chrysler VE Valiant V.I.P. Sedan.jpg

== Chrysler VF VIP (1969–1970) ==
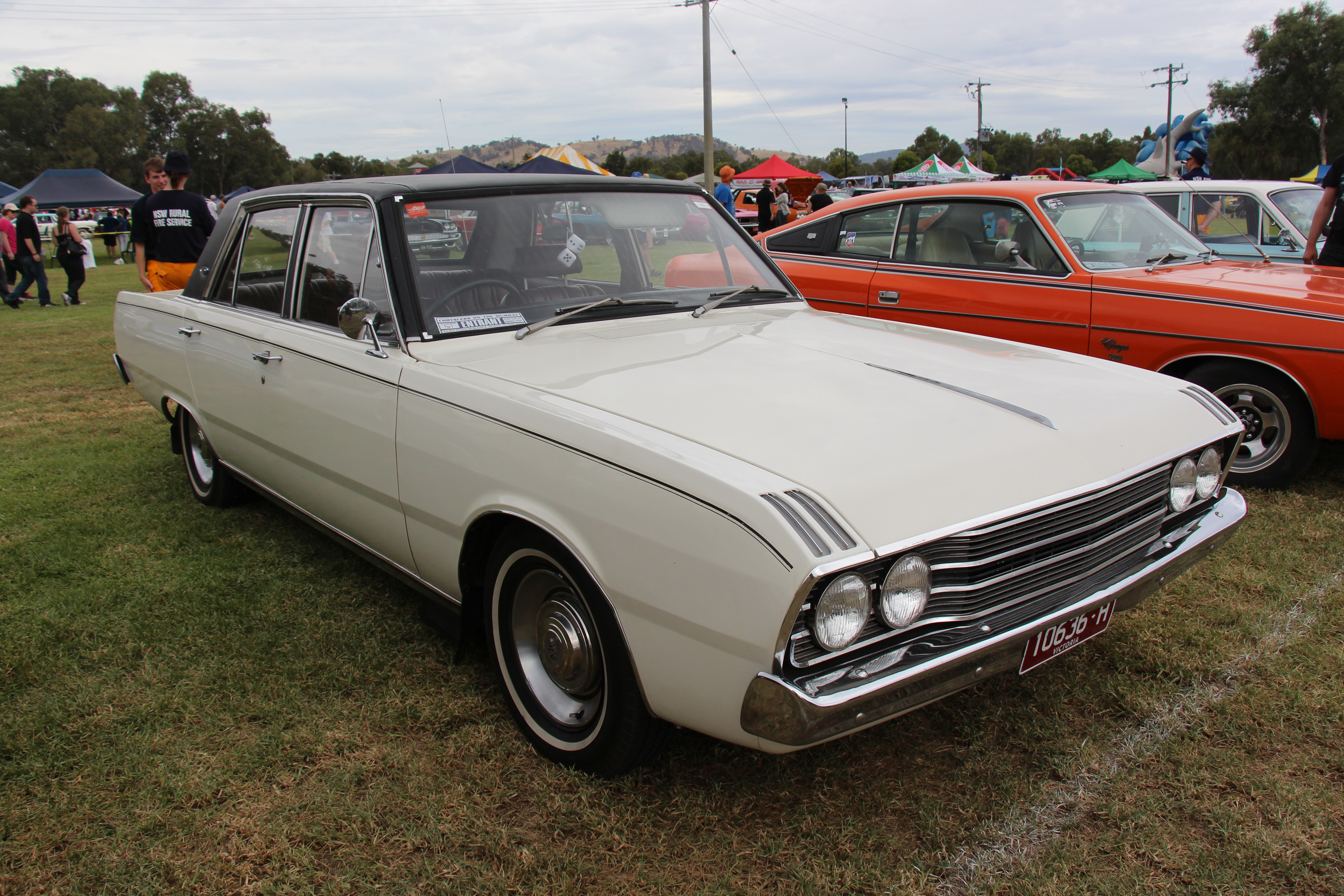
Chrysler VF VIP

The VF series Chrysler VIP was introduced in May 1969 and was marketed as the “VIP by Chrysler”, without the Valiant name. It was intended to fill a gap in Chrysler Australia’s lineup between the Chrysler Valiant and the Dodge Phoenix and it would compete directly against two other Australian designed luxury vehicles, the Ford Fairlane and the Holden Brougham. Although based on the VF series Chrysler Valiant, the VIP had a wheelbase which was 100mm longer at 2850mm. It was also bigger, more expensive and more luxurious than the older model. Visual differences when compared to the VF Valiant sedan included four headlights rather than two, different rear lights, a unique rear window and a heavily padded vinyl roof. Unlike its predecessor, the VF VIP was available only as a 4 door sedan.

The VIP was offered with the buyer's choice of a 225 cu in (3.7 L) Slant-6 or a 318 cu in (5.2 L) “Fireball” LA-series V8 engine. Chrysler's Torqueflite 3-speed automatic transmission was standard equipment with either engine. Coaxial power steering and front disc brakes were optional with the six and standard with the V8.

== Chrysler VG VIP (1970–1971) ==
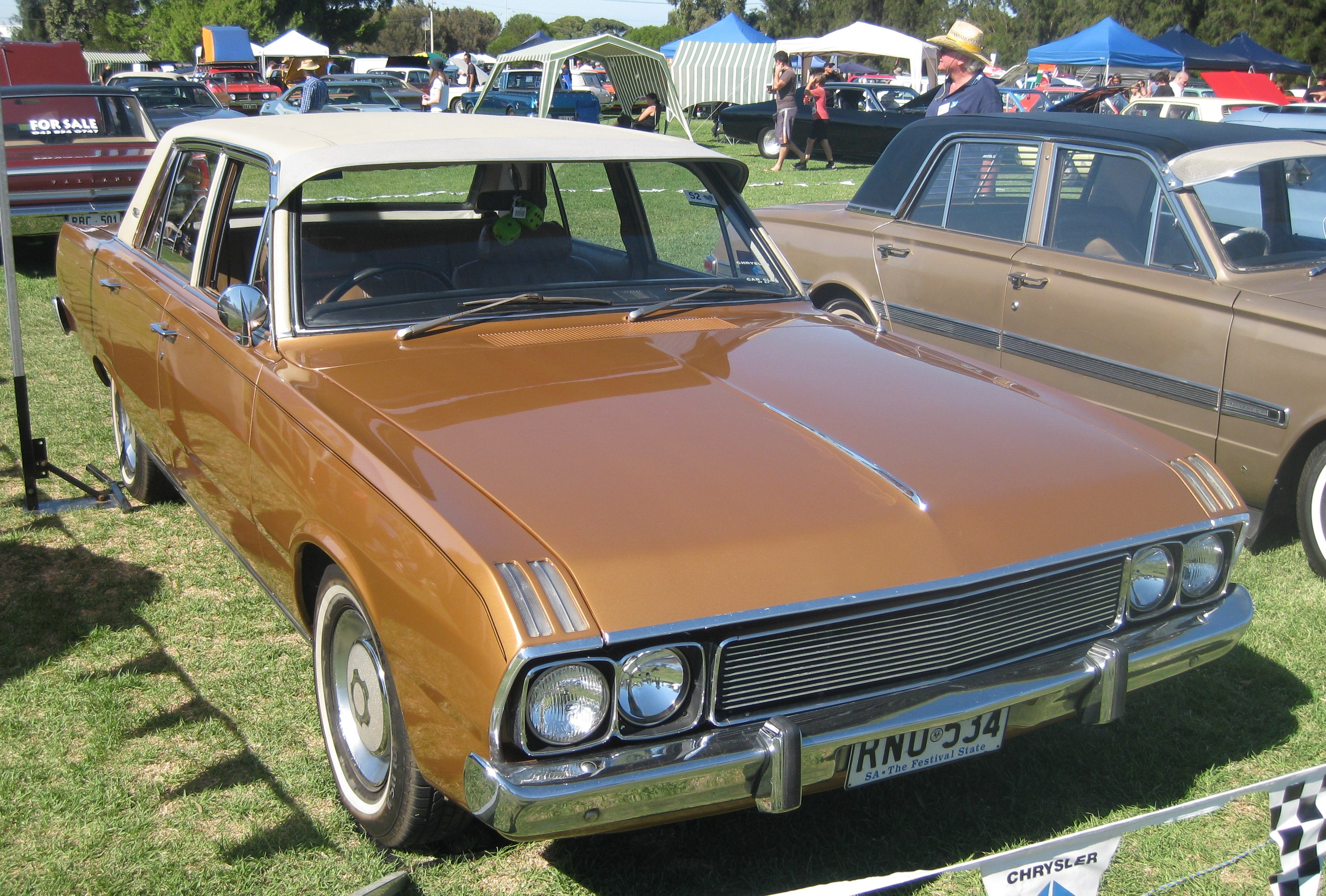
Chrysler VG VIP

A facelifted VG series Chrysler VIP was introduced in 1970, replacing the VF model. A 245 cu in (4.0 L) Hemi-6 replaced the 225 cu in (3.7 L) Slant-6 and the 318 cu in (5.2 L) “Fireball” V8 remained an option. The VG VIP was the first Australian made car to be fitted with air conditioning as standard equipment.

== Replacement ==
The VG series Chrysler VIP was replaced by the Chrysler by Chrysler in November 1971.

== See also ==
- Chrysler Valiant
