= Chrysler Valiant (VF) =

Australian full-size car

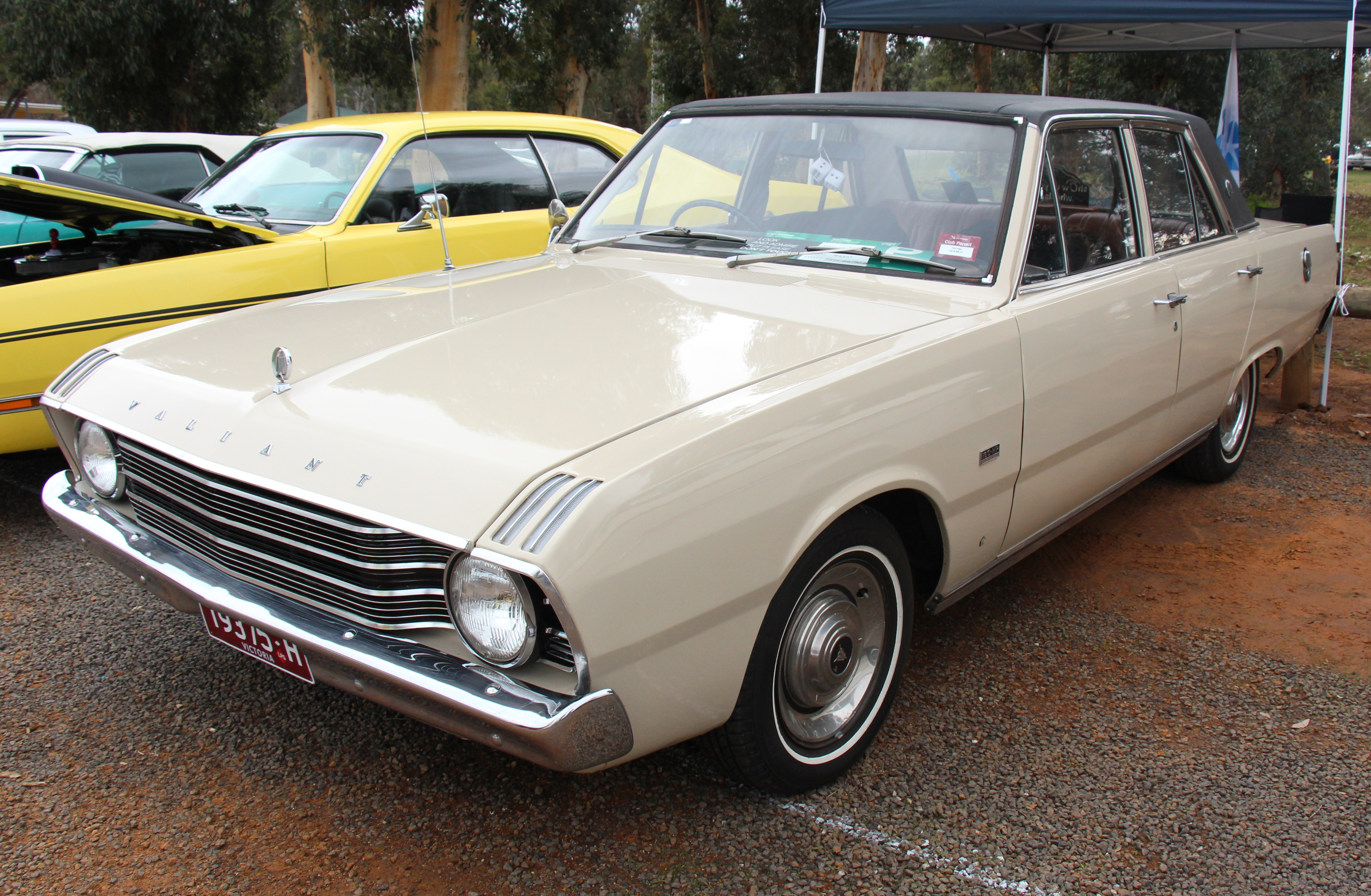
- Chrysler Valiant Regal sedan

Overview
- Manufacturer: Chrysler Australia
- Also called: Dodge Utility
- Production: March 1969 – February 1970
- Assembly: Australia: Tonsley Park; New Zealand: Petone (Todd Motors)

Body and chassis
- Body style: 4-door sedan 2-door hardtop 5-door station wagon 2-door coupe utility
- Layout: FR layout
- Related: Chrysler VF VIP

Powertrain
- Engine: 225 cu in (3.7 L) slant-6 318 cu in (5.2 L) V8
- Transmission: 3-speed manual 3 speed automatic

Dimensions
- Wheelbase: 108.0 inches (2743 mm) (sedan) 111 inches (2819 mm) (Hardtop)
- Length: 192.3 inches (4885 mm) (sedan)
- Width: 69.7 inches (1770 mm) (sedan)
- Height: 55.0 inches (1397 mm) (sedan)
- Kerb weight: 2950 lb (1338 kg) (sedan)

Chronology
- Predecessor: Chrysler VE Valiant
- Successor: Chrysler VG Valiant

The Chrysler Valiant (VF) is an automobile that was produced in Australia by Chrysler Australia from 1969 to 1970. It was released in March 1969, replacing the Chrysler VE Valiant.

== Changes ==
The VF Valiant was a facelifted version of the VE Valiant, featuring four new quarter panels, new lights and a new grille. The four-door sedan model marked a major departure from the U.S Plymouth Valiant models that previous Australian models were based on with Australian engineering now taking precedence.

Parking and Turn signal lights in the VF range were now mounted above the headlights and the front came with a unique convex one-piece grille. Seating, safety features and soundproofing were improved, Pacer and Regal 770 models were new and a hardtop body style was offered for the first time.

The hardtop combined the VF Valiant front, from the A-pillar forward, with the rear of the U.S fourth-generation Dodge Dart Swinger. This included the Dart floorpan with its 111-inch wheelbase.

Chrysler Australia continued to build Valiant station wagons which Plymouth in the United States had ceased production of since 1967.

Coupe utilities retained the rear styling of the previous VE series with only the front styling revised.

== Model range ==
The VF series Valiant was offered in 4-door sedan, 2-door hardtop, 5-door station wagon and 2-door coupe utility models.

- Valiant sedan (VF-M41)
- Valiant hardtop (VF-M23)
- Valiant Safari wagon (VF-M45)
- Valiant Pacer sedan (VF-S41)
- Valiant Regal sedan (VF-H41)
- Valiant Regal hardtop (VF-H23)
- Valiant Regal Safari wagon (VF- H45)
- Valiant Regal 770 sedan (VF-H41 shared with Regal)
- Valiant Regal 770 hardtop (VF-H23 shared with Regal)
- Valiant utility (VF-L20)
- Valiant Wayfarer utility (VF-M20)

The hardtop models were introduced in September 1969. There were also 20 Pacer station wagons built. These show up in production records as model code VF-S45.

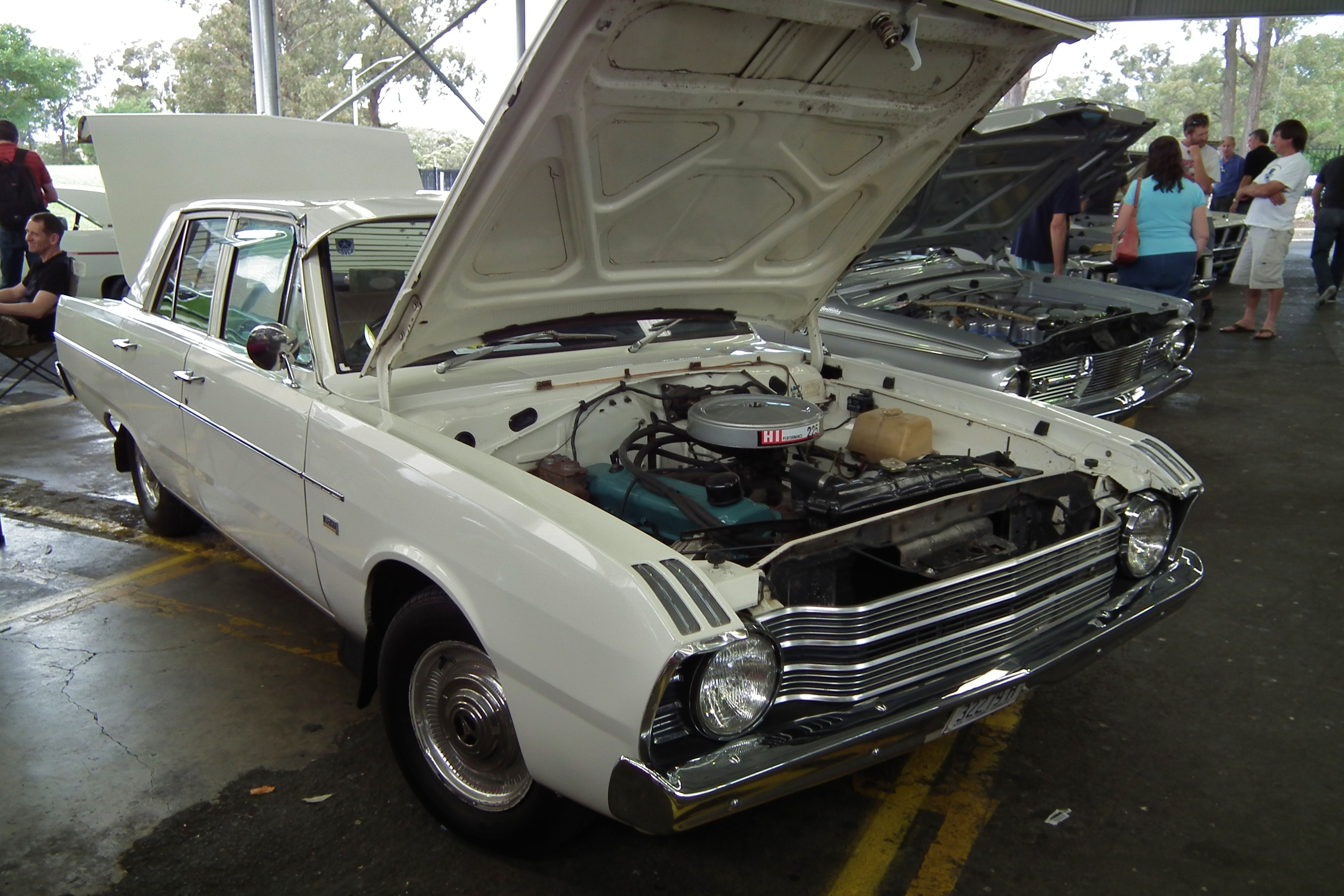
Chrysler VF Valiant sedan

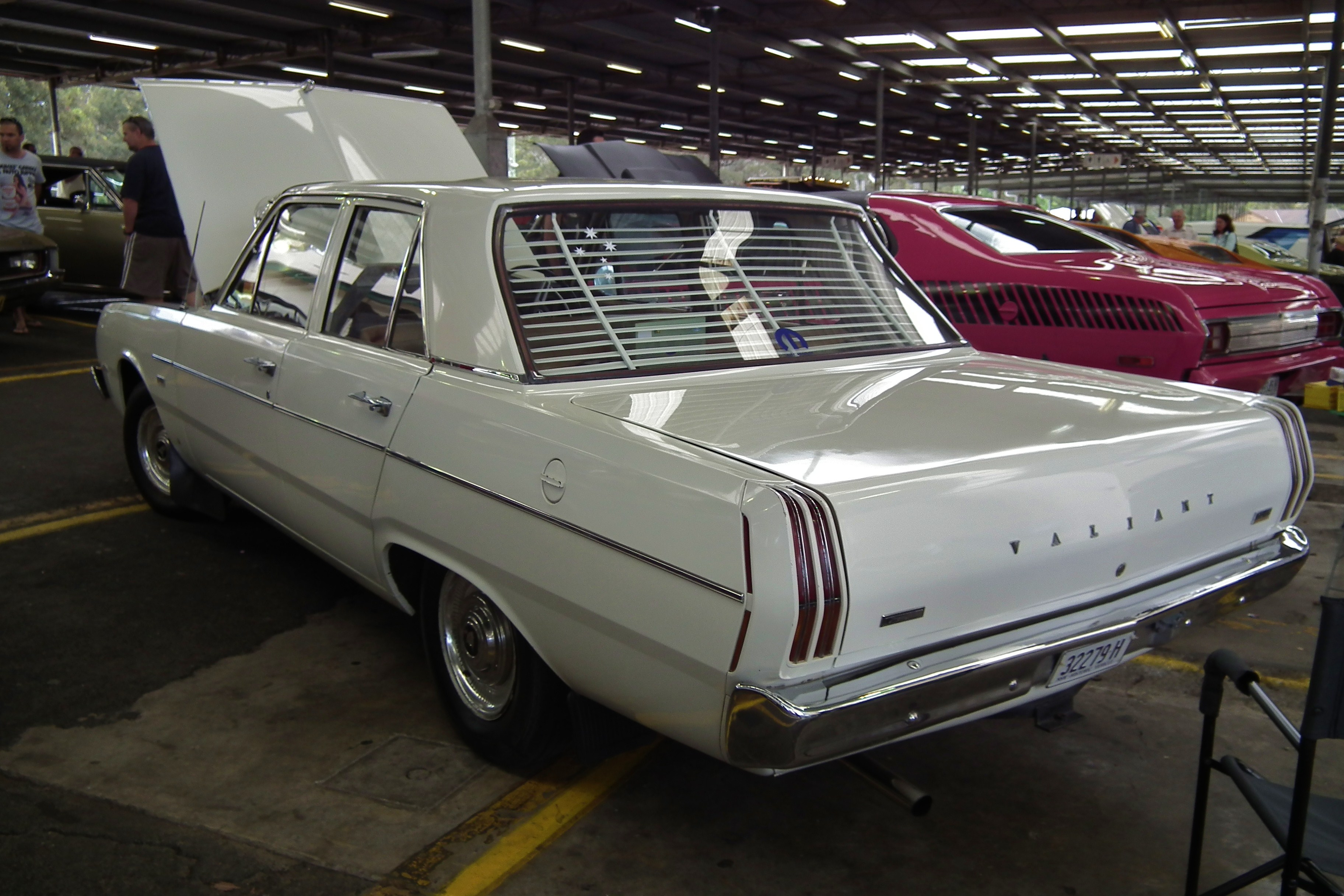
Chrysler VF Valiant sedan

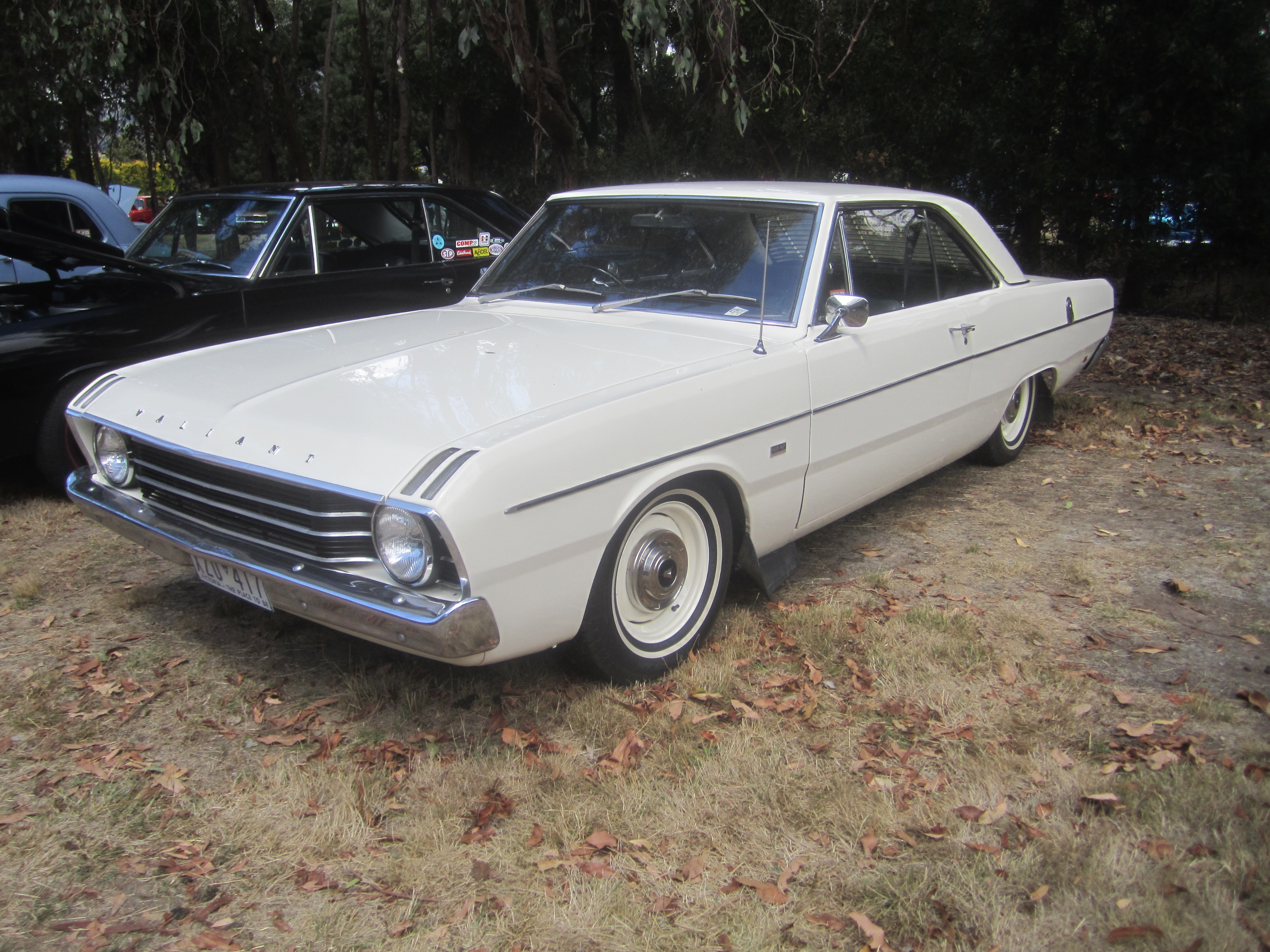
Chrysler VF Valiant hardtop

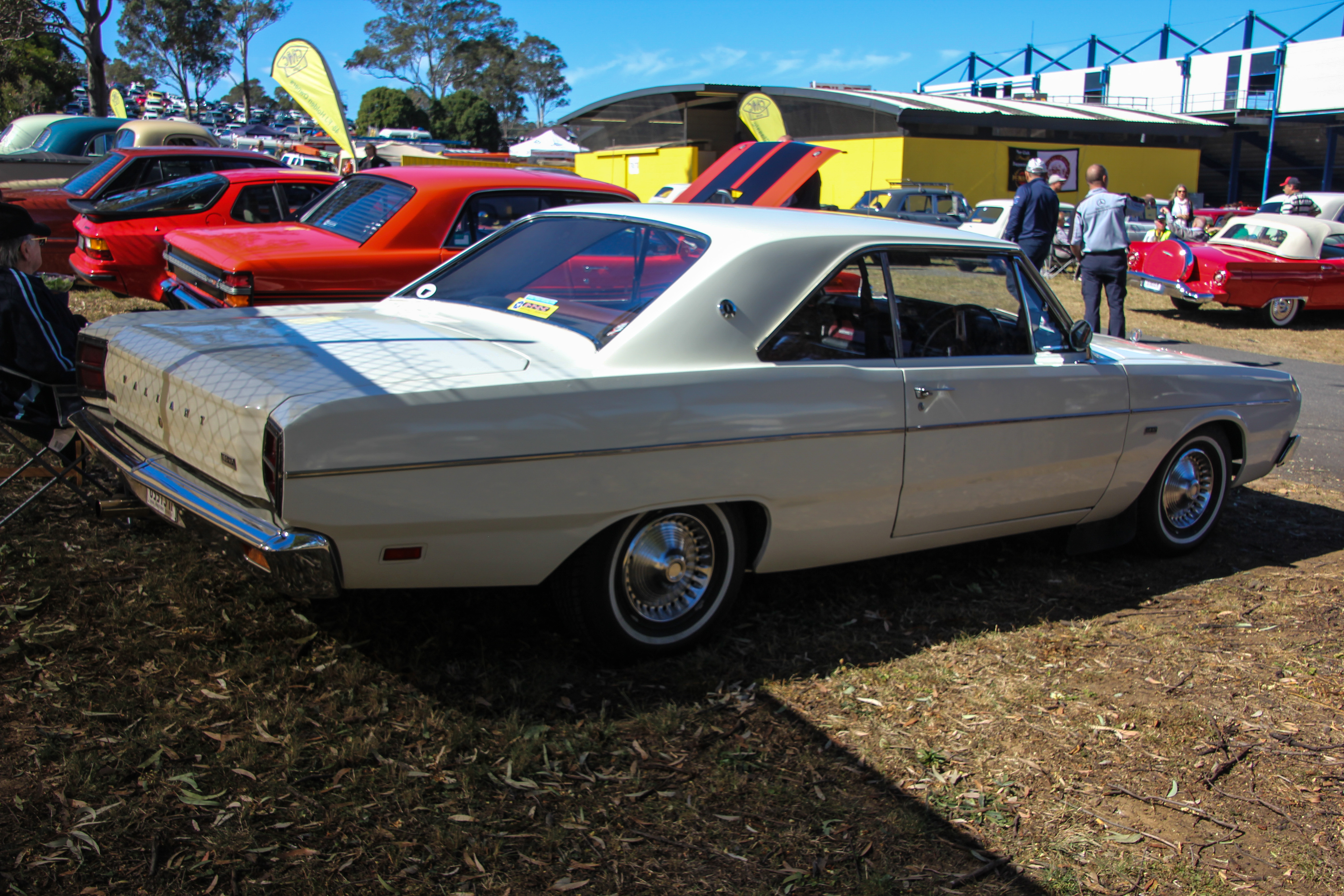
Chrysler VF Valiant hardtop (later model hubcaps)

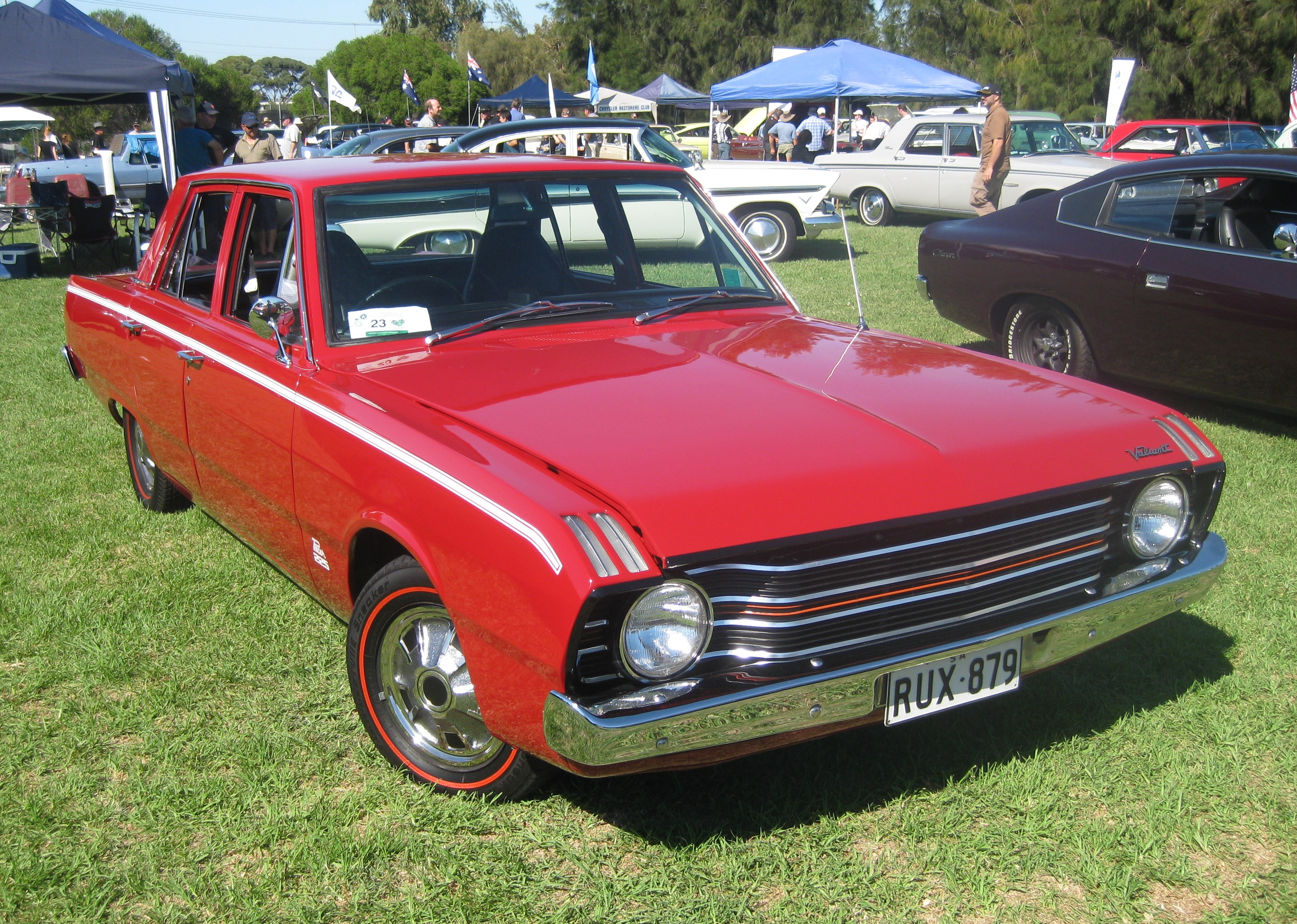
Chrysler VF Valiant Pacer sedan

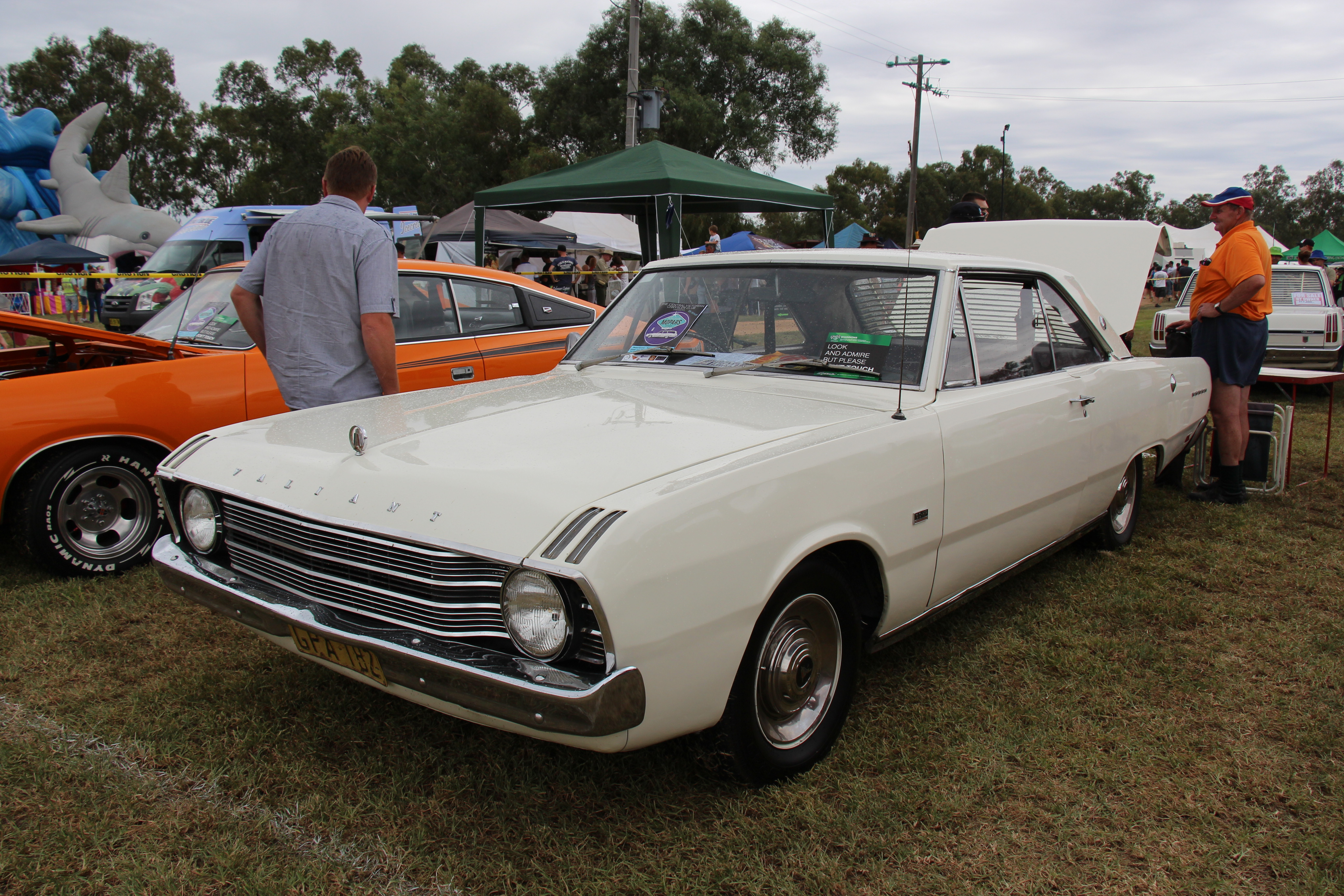
Chrysler VF Valiant Regal Hardtop

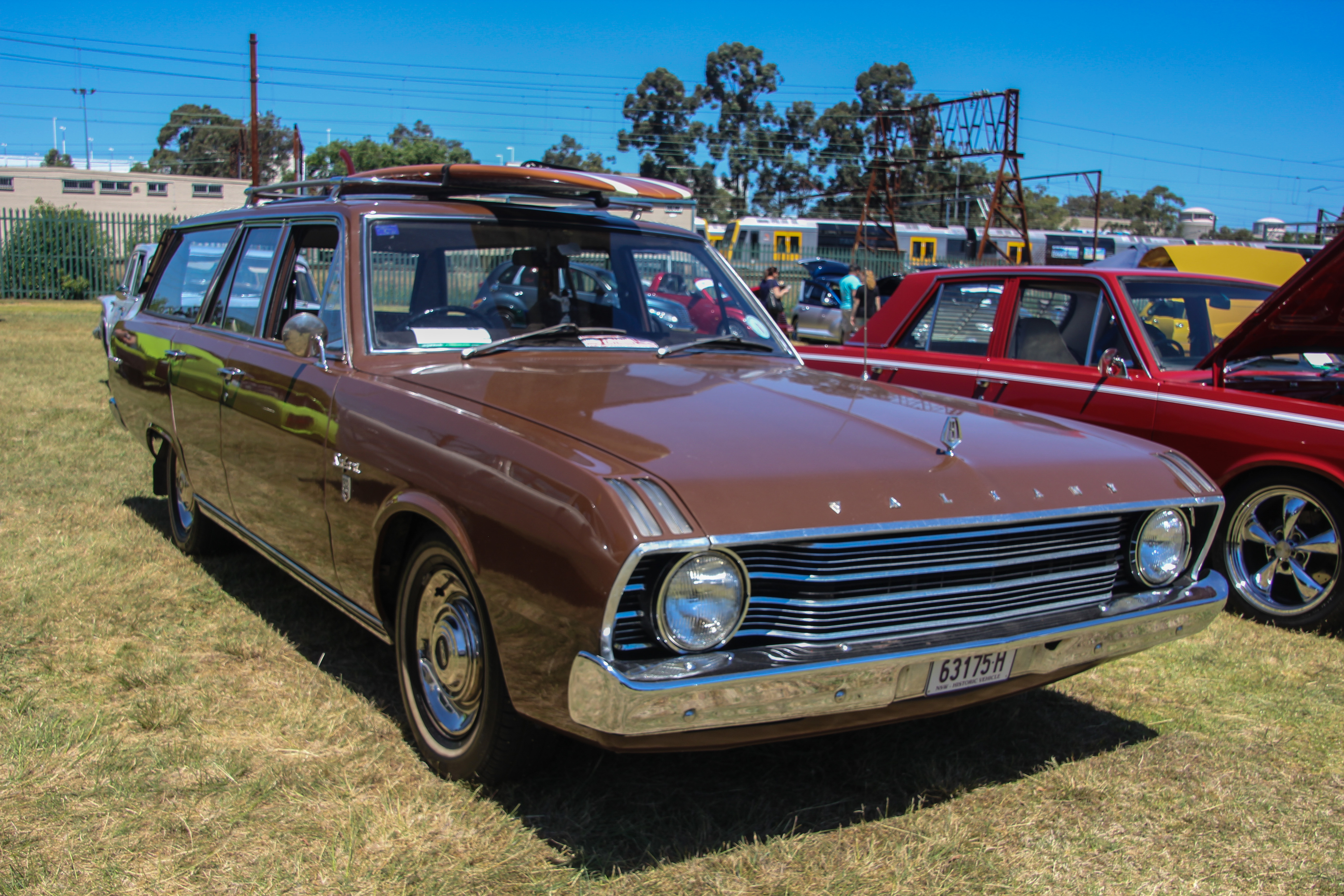
Chrysler VF Valiant Regal Safari wagon

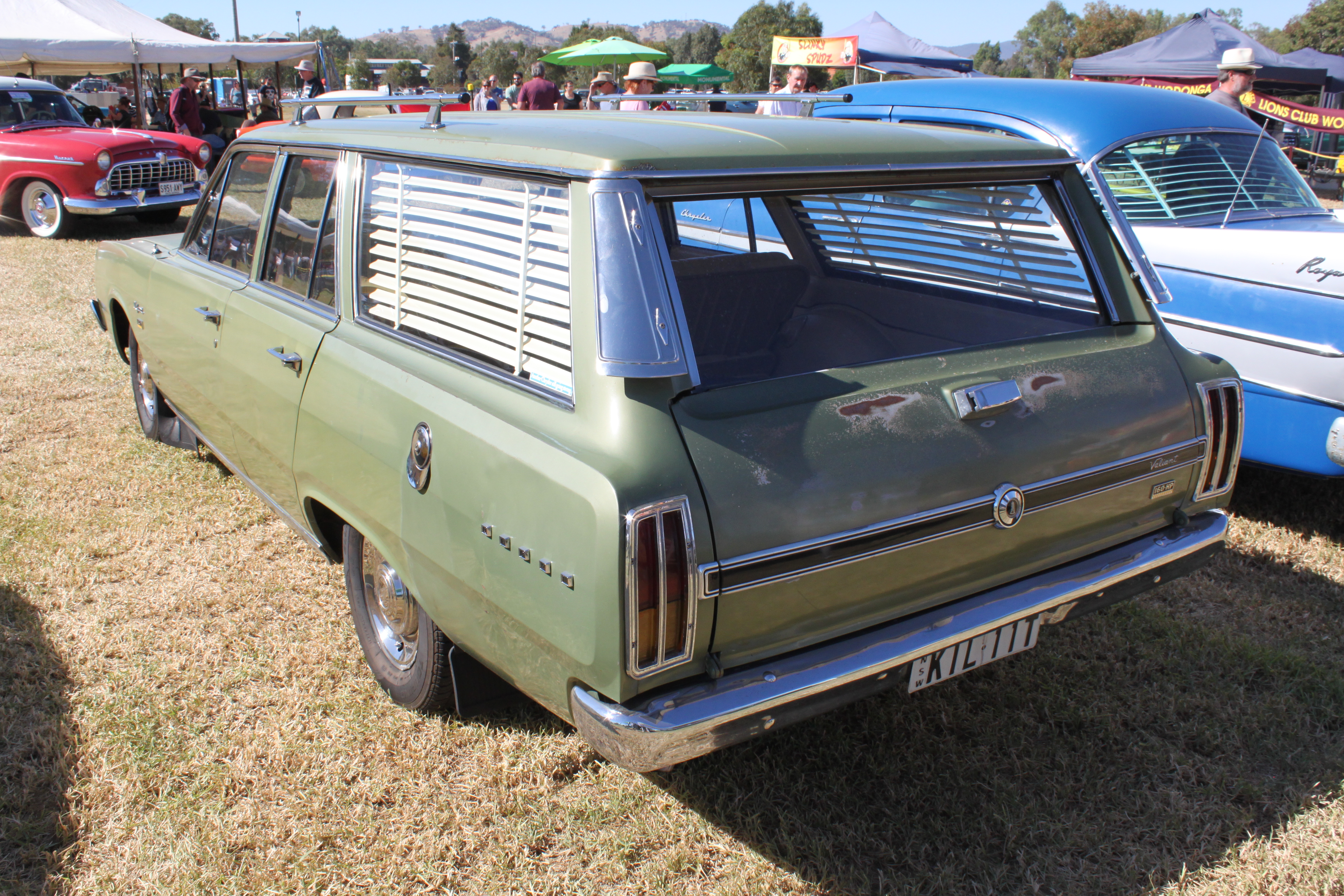
Chrysler VF Valiant Regal Safari wagon

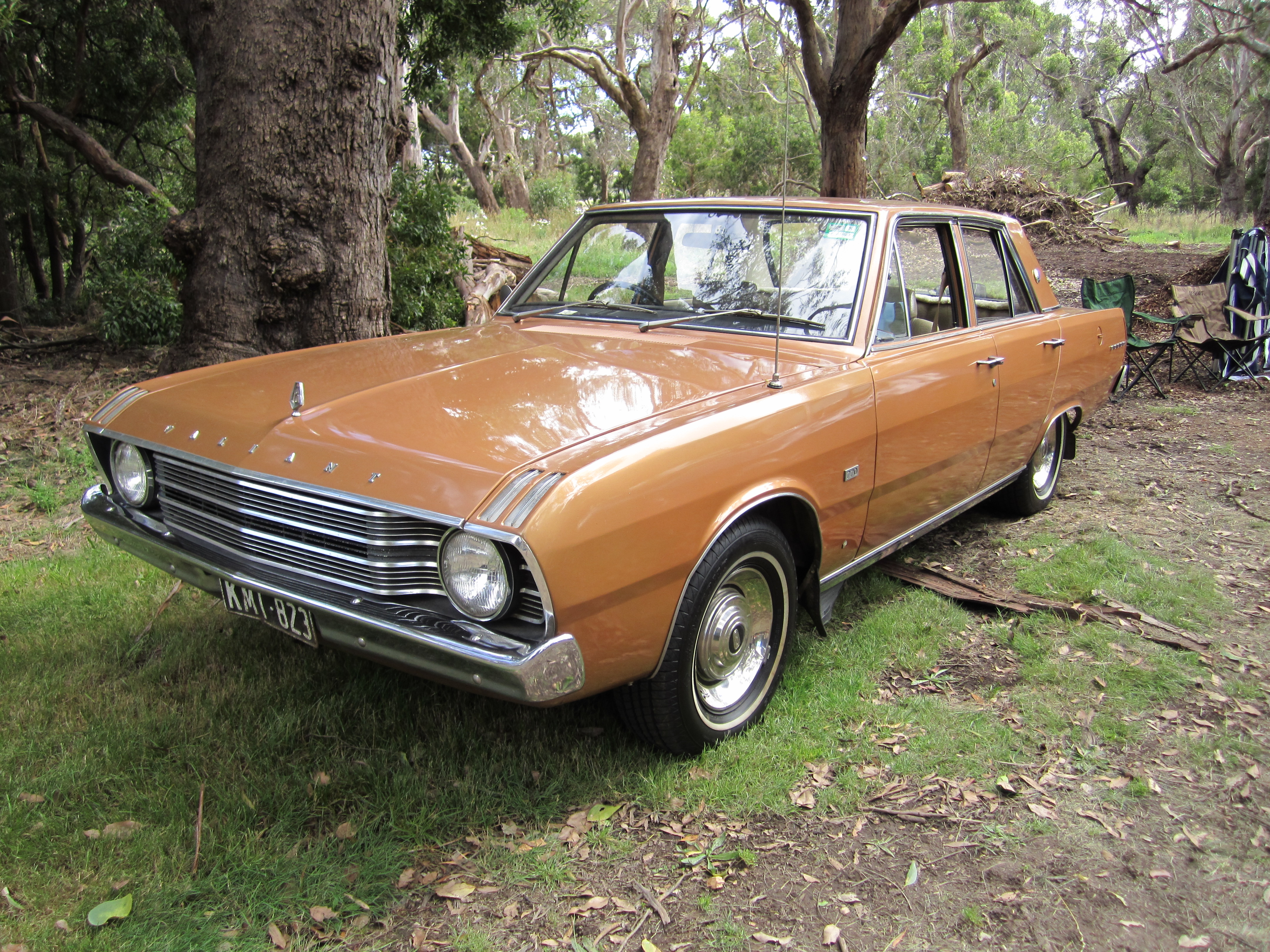
Chrysler VF Valiant Regal 770 sedan

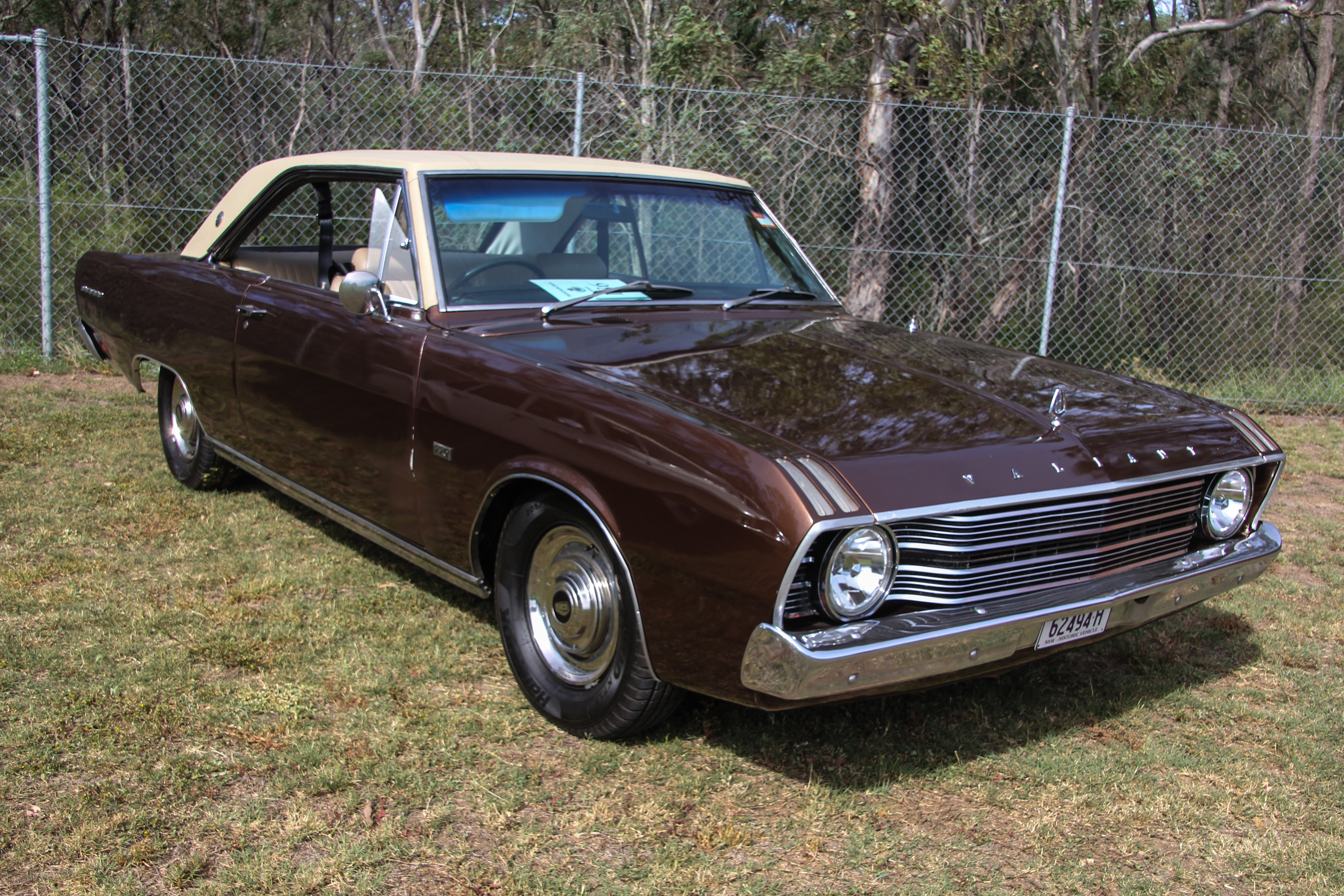
Chrysler VF Valiant Regal 770 hardtop

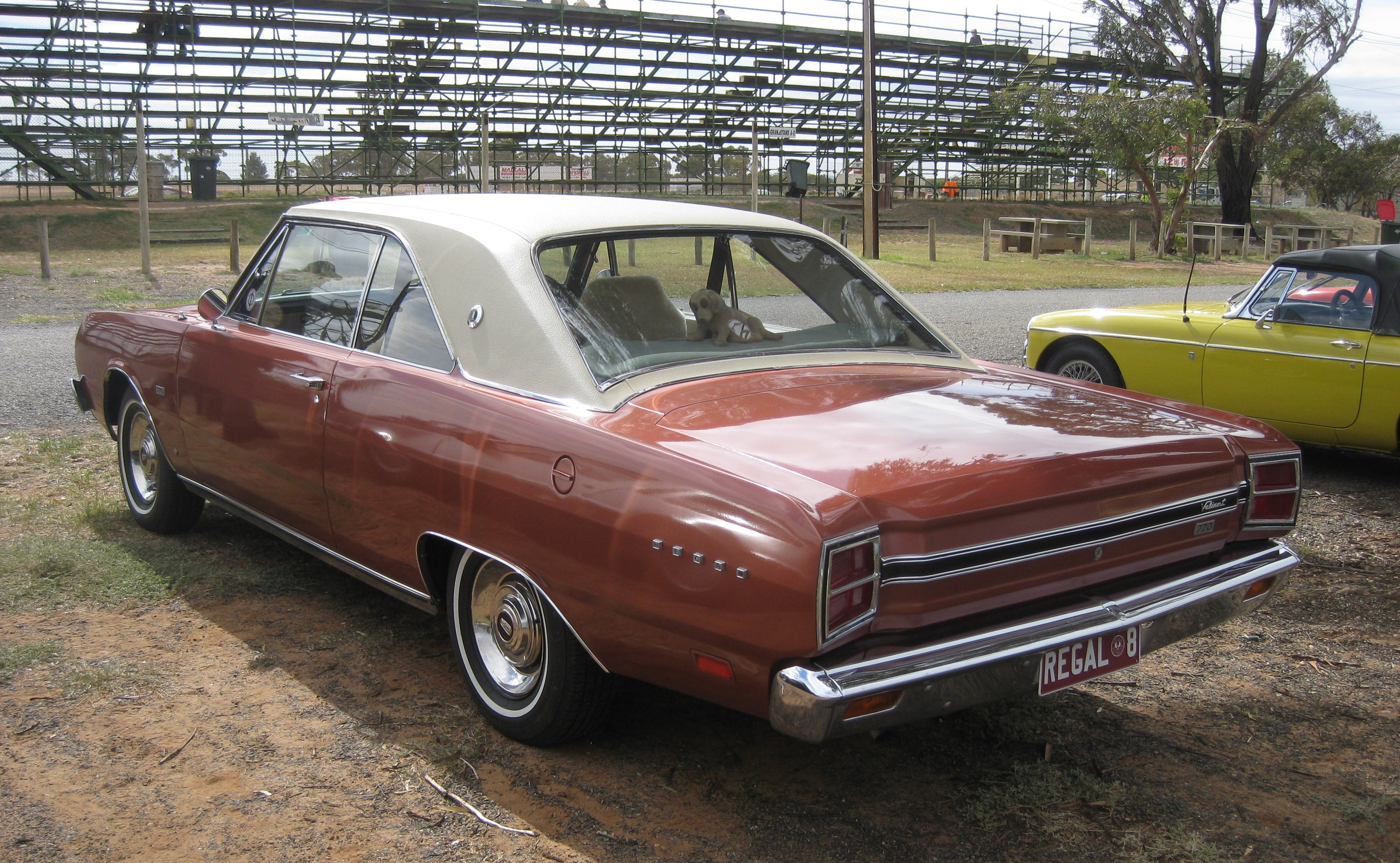
Chrysler VF Valiant Regal 770 Hardtop

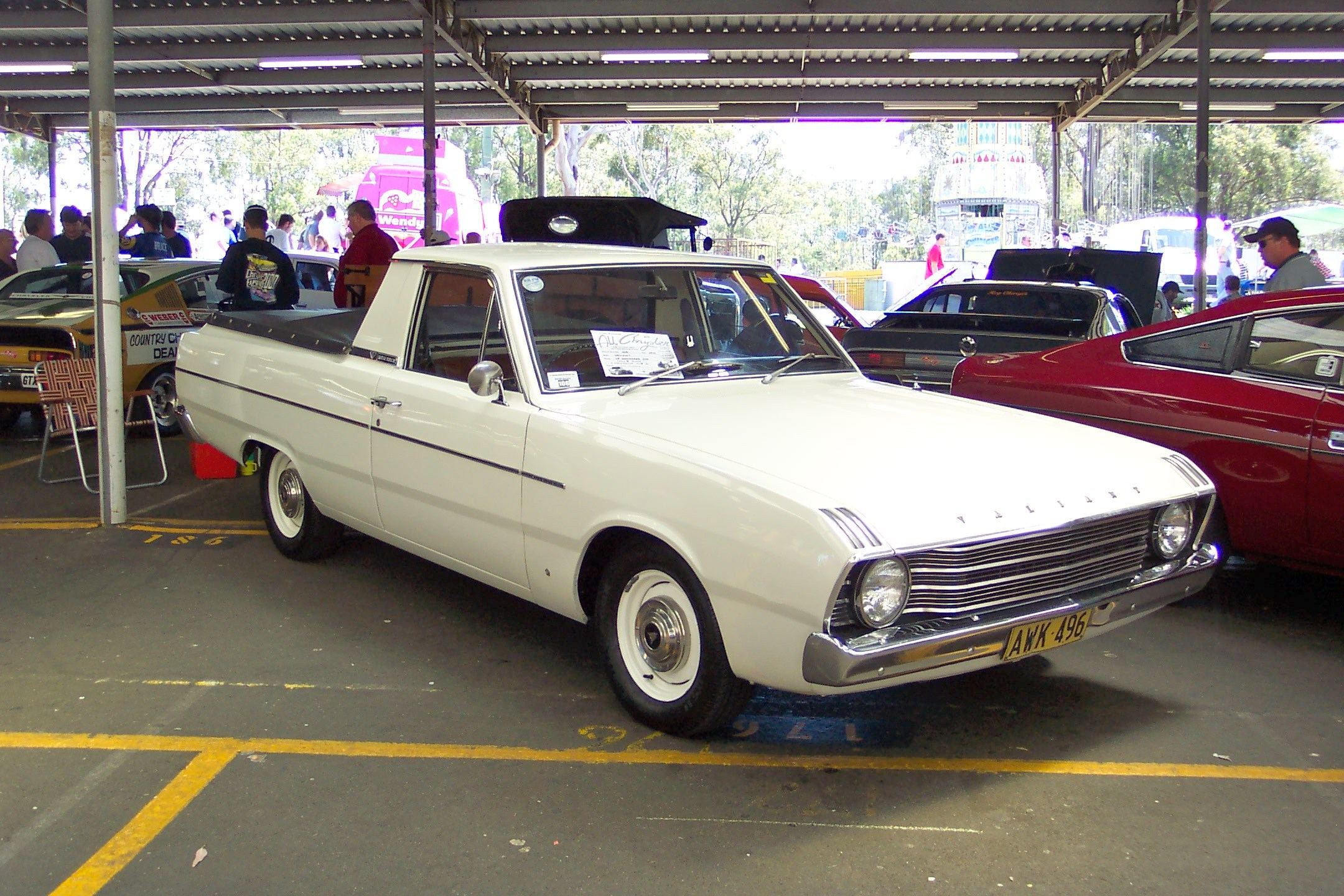
Chrysler VF Valiant Wayfarer utility

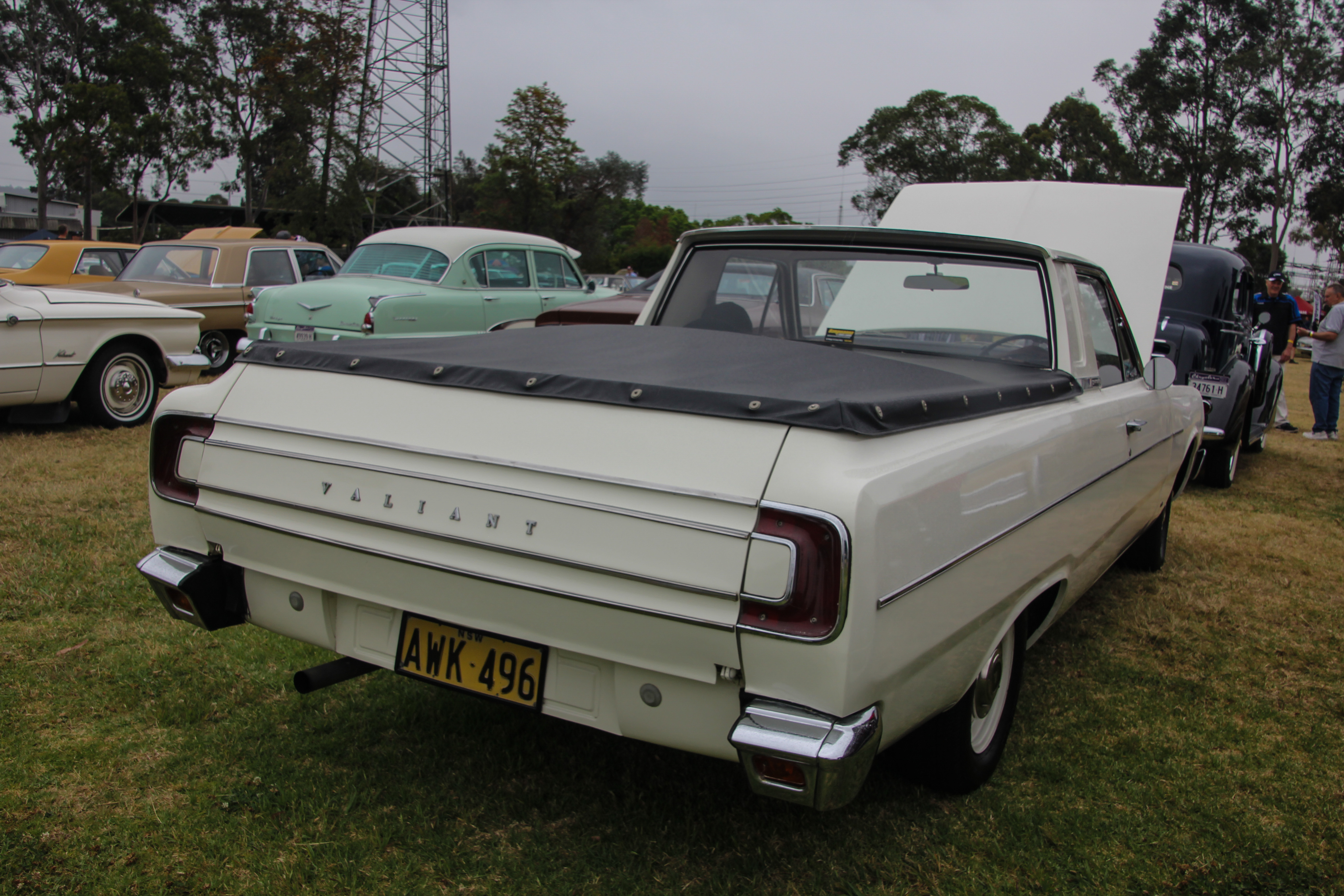
Chrysler VF Valiant Wayfarer utility

=== Dodge utility ===
A heavy duty variant of the Valiant utility was marketed under the Dodge name. (VF-E20)

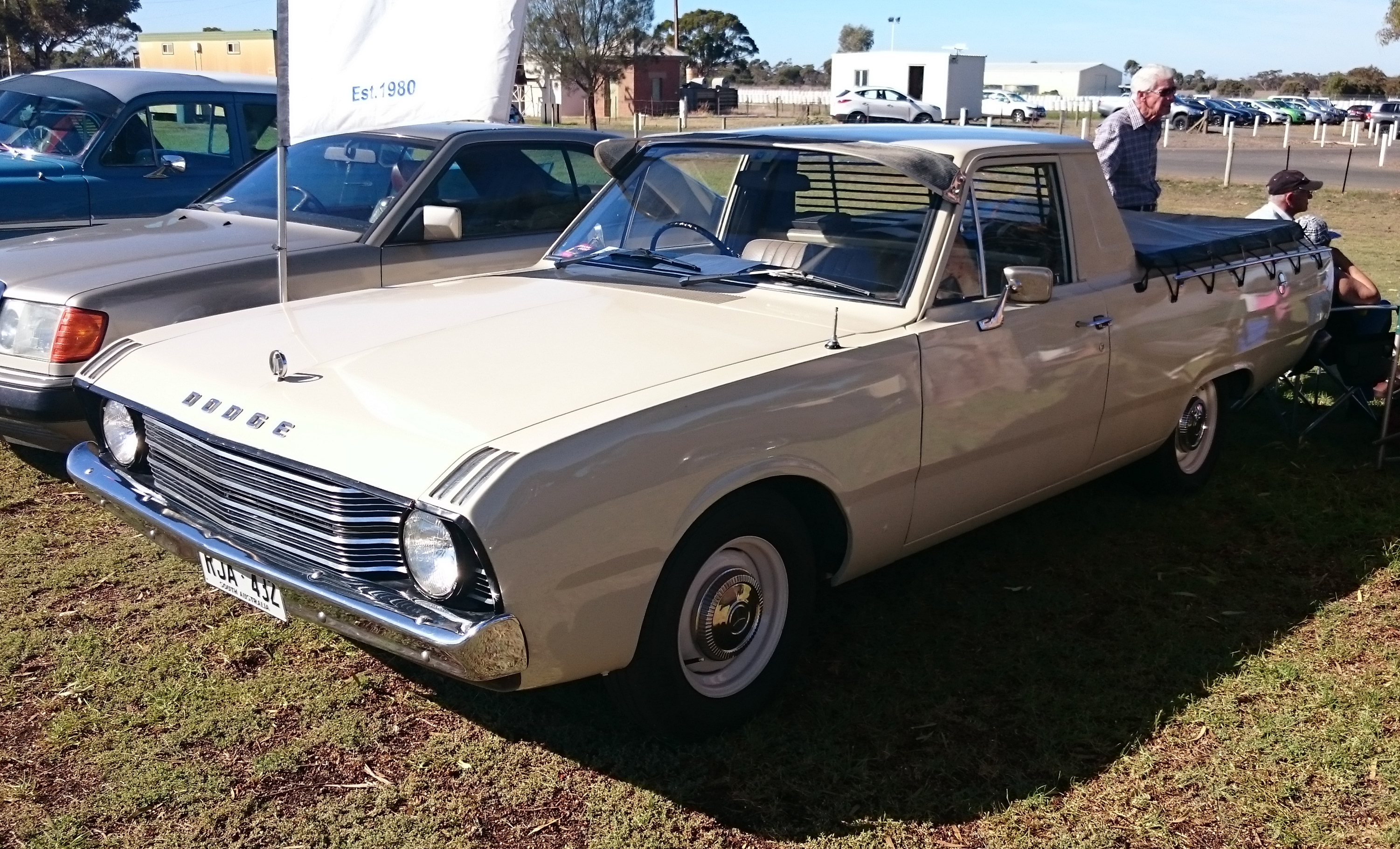
Dodge VF utility

== Engines and transmissions ==
Five engines were offered in the VF Valiant range.

- 145 bhp 225 cu in (3.7 L) Slant-six
- 160 bhp 225 cu in (3.7 L) "High Performance" Slant-six
- 175 bhp 225 cu in (3.7 L) "High Compression" Slant-six
- 210 bhp 318 cu in (5.2 L) V8
- 230 bhp 318 cu in (5.2 L) "Fireball" V8

The “High Compression” six was fitted to the Pacer and was not available in other models. The "Fireball" V8 was standard on Regal 770 models.

Two transmissions were available.

- Three speed manual
- Three speed "Torqueflite" automatic

== Chrysler VF VIP ==
In May 1969 Chrysler Australia released the VF series Chrysler VIP (VF-P41). The VIP had a 112-inch (2850 mm) wheelbase, which was 4 inches longer than that of the Valiant sedan. The VIP was visually differentiated with a four headlight grille, unique tail-lights and a “limousine” rear window. The car was badged and marketed as the “VIP by Chrysler”, unlike the VE model, which was a Chrysler Valiant VIP. The VIP station wagon was no longer offered.

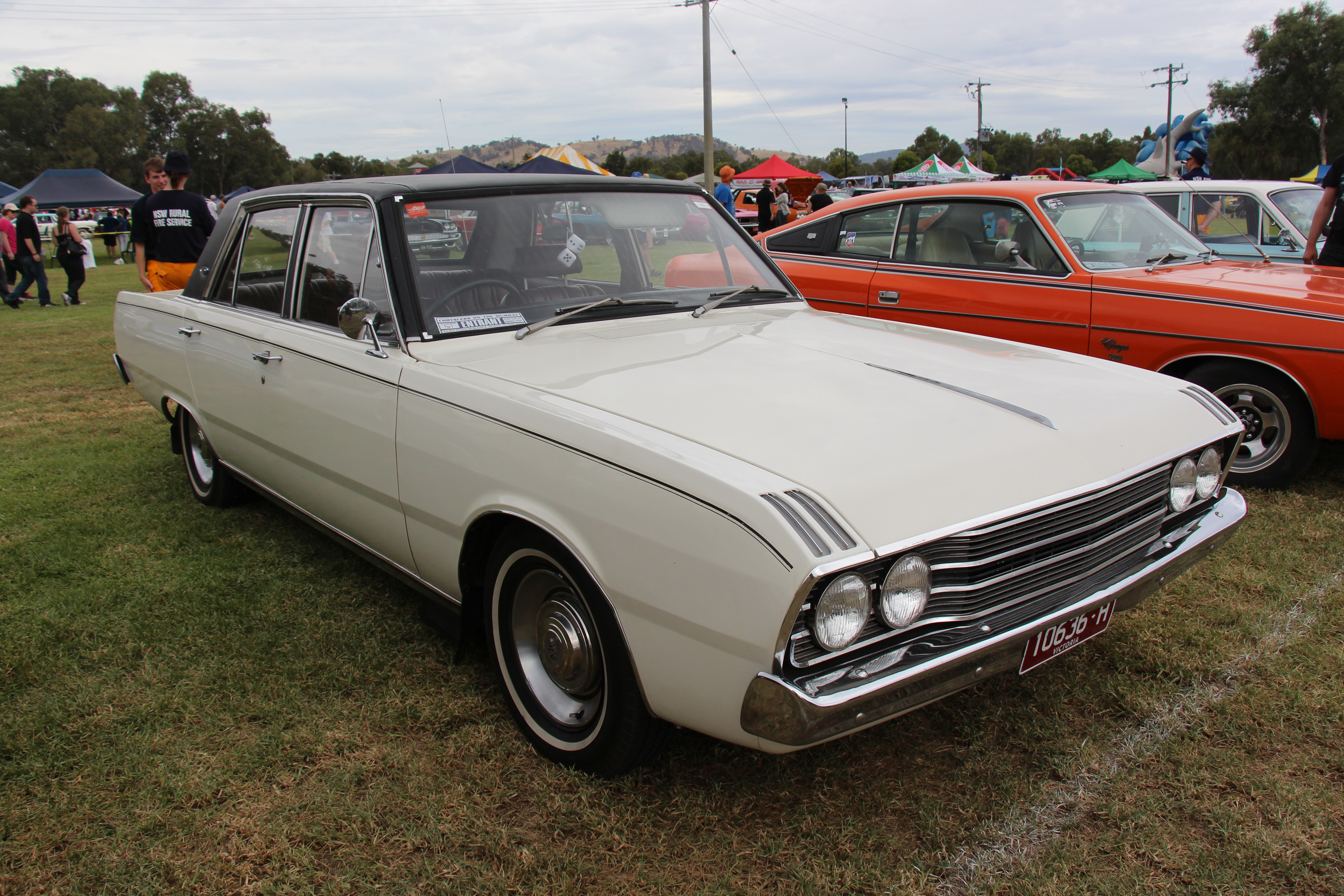
Chrysler VF VIP sedan

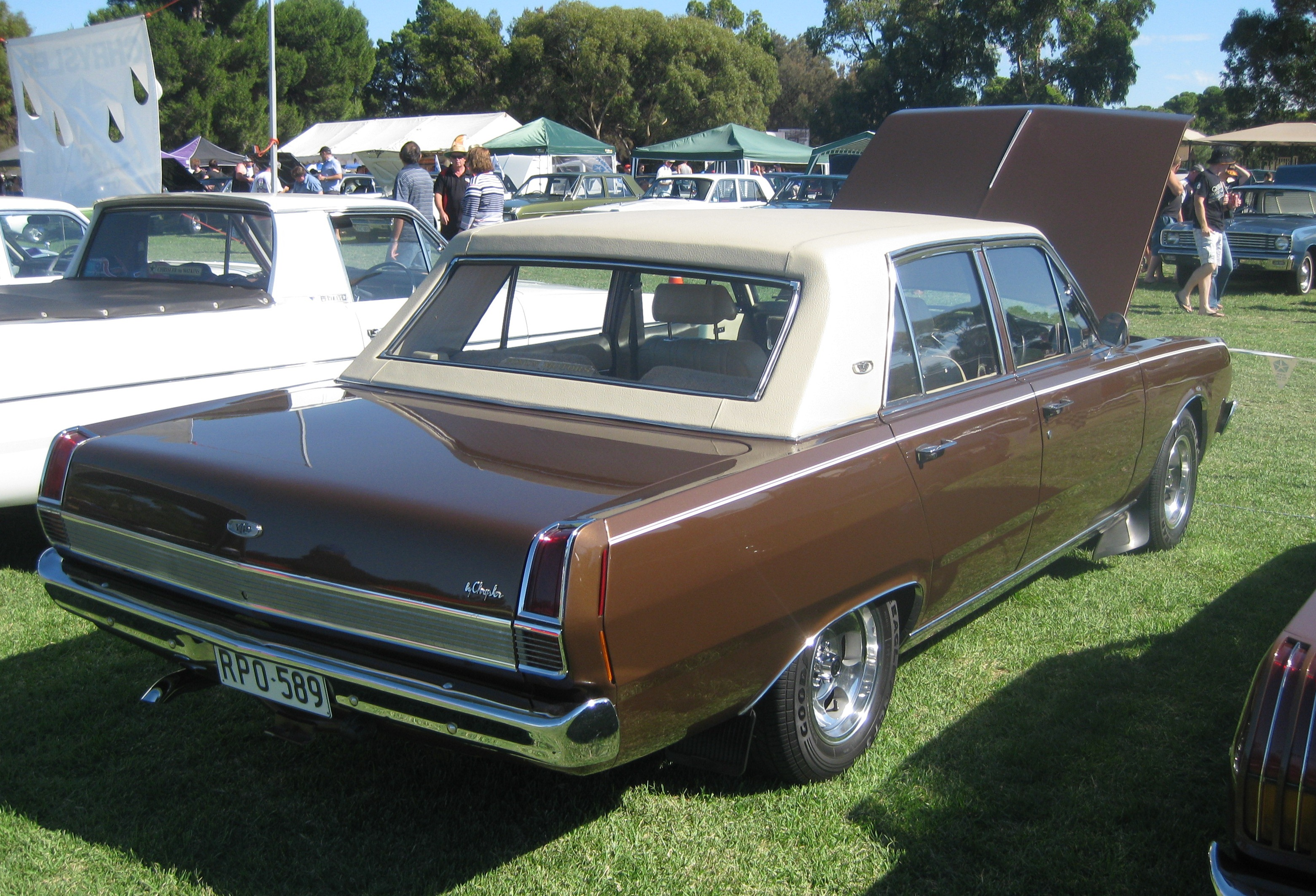
Chrysler VF VIP sedan (non standard wheels)

== Production and replacement ==
A total of 52,933 VF series models, including 3,721 VIPs, were built prior to its replacement by the VG Valiant in March 1970.

== See also ==
- Chrysler Valiant
