= Chrysler Valiant (VE) =

Australian full-size car

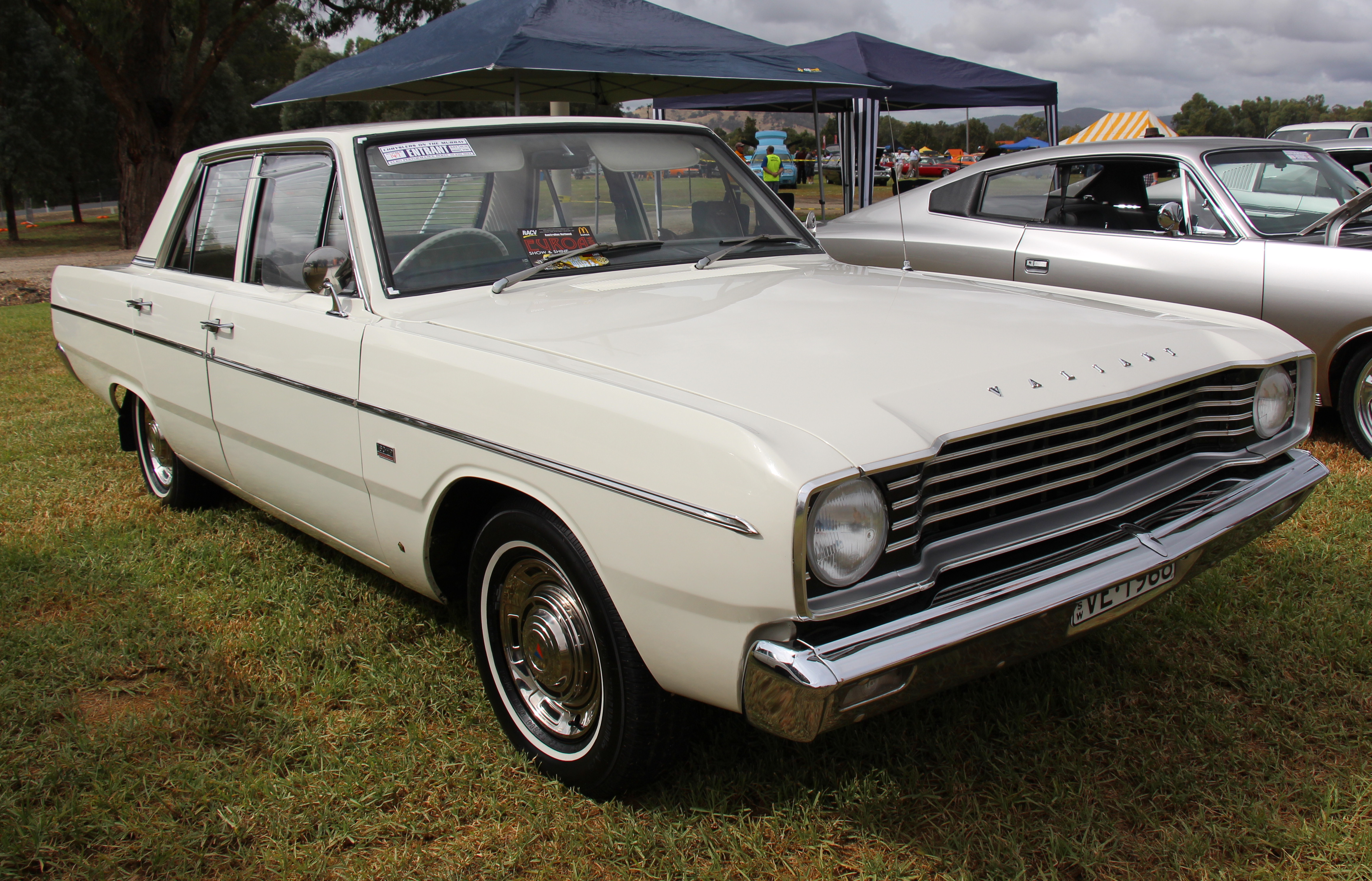
- Chrysler Valiant sedan

Overview
- Manufacturer: Chrysler Australia
- Also called: Dodge Utility
- Production: October 1967 – February 1969
- Assembly: Australia: Tonsley Park; New Zealand: Petone (Todd Motors)

Body and chassis
- Body style: 4-door sedan 5-door station wagon 2-door coupe utility
- Layout: FR layout

Powertrain
- Engine: 225 cu in (3.7 L) I6; 273 cu in (4.5 L) V8
- Transmission: 3-speed manual 3-speed automatic

Dimensions
- Wheelbase: 108.0 inches (2743 mm) (sedan)
- Length: 193.7 inches (4920 mm) (sedan)
- Width: 69.7 inches (1770 mm) (sedan)
- Height: 55.0 inches (1397 mm) (sedan)
- Kerb weight: 2950 lb (1338 kg) (sedan)

Chronology
- Predecessor: Chrysler VC Valiant
- Successor: Chrysler VF Valiant

The Chrysler Valiant (VE) is an automobile that was produced in Australia by Chrysler Australia from 1967 to 1969. It was released in October 1967, replacing the Chrysler VC Valiant. The premium model in the range was renamed Valiant VIP due to the V8 engine becoming an option across the entire range.

== Model range ==
The VE series Valiant was offered in 4-door sedan, 5-door station wagon and 2-door coupe utility models.

- Valiant sedan (VE-M41)
- Valiant Safari wagon (VE-M45)
- Valiant Regal sedan (VE-H41)
- Valiant Regal Safari wagon (VE-H45)
- Valiant VIP sedan (VE-P41)
- Valiant VIP Safari wagon (VE-P45)
- Valiant utility (VE-L20)
- Valiant Wayfarer utility (VE-M20)

VE series Valiant and Valiant Wayfarer utility models were introduced in May 1968.

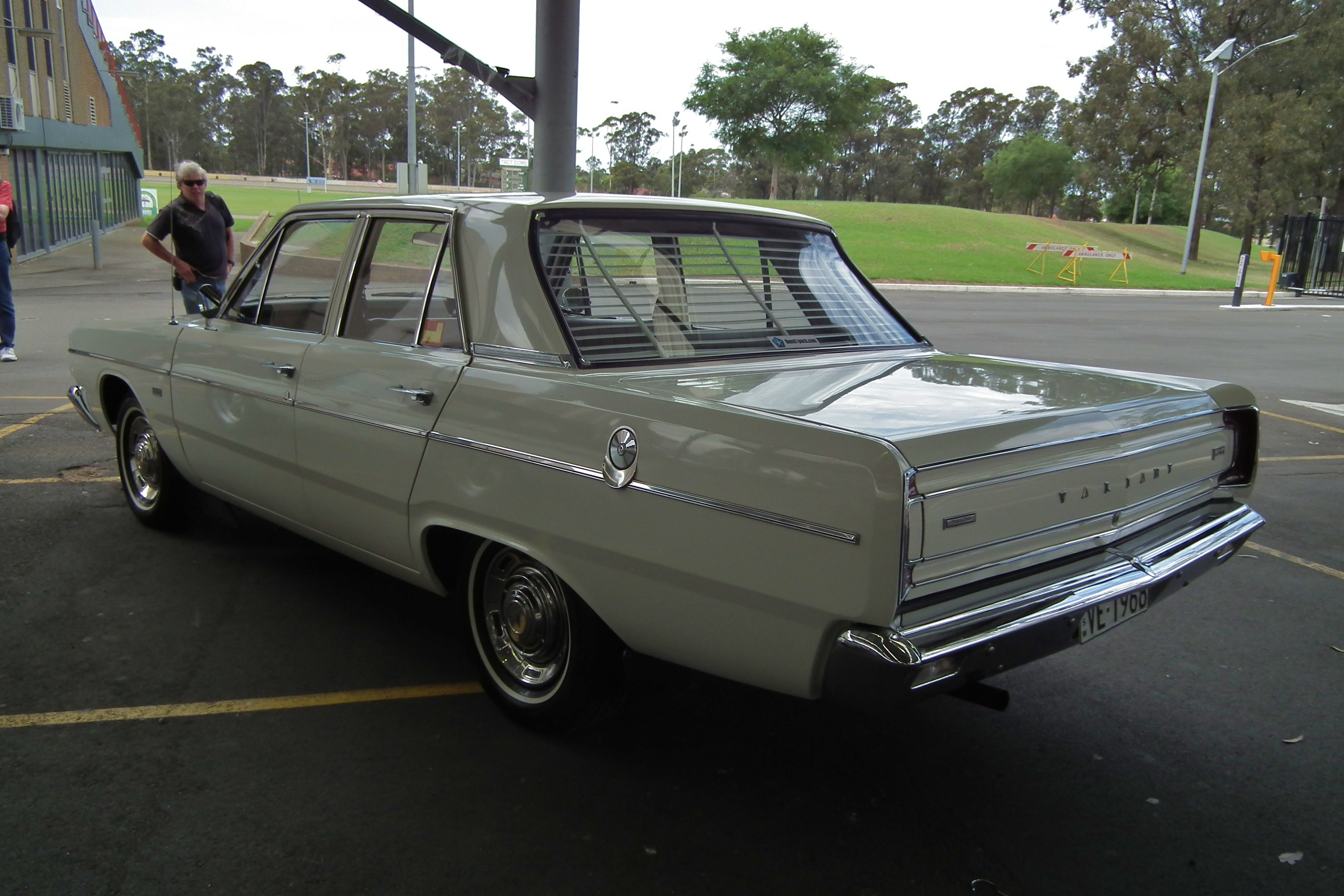
Chrysler VE Valiant sedan

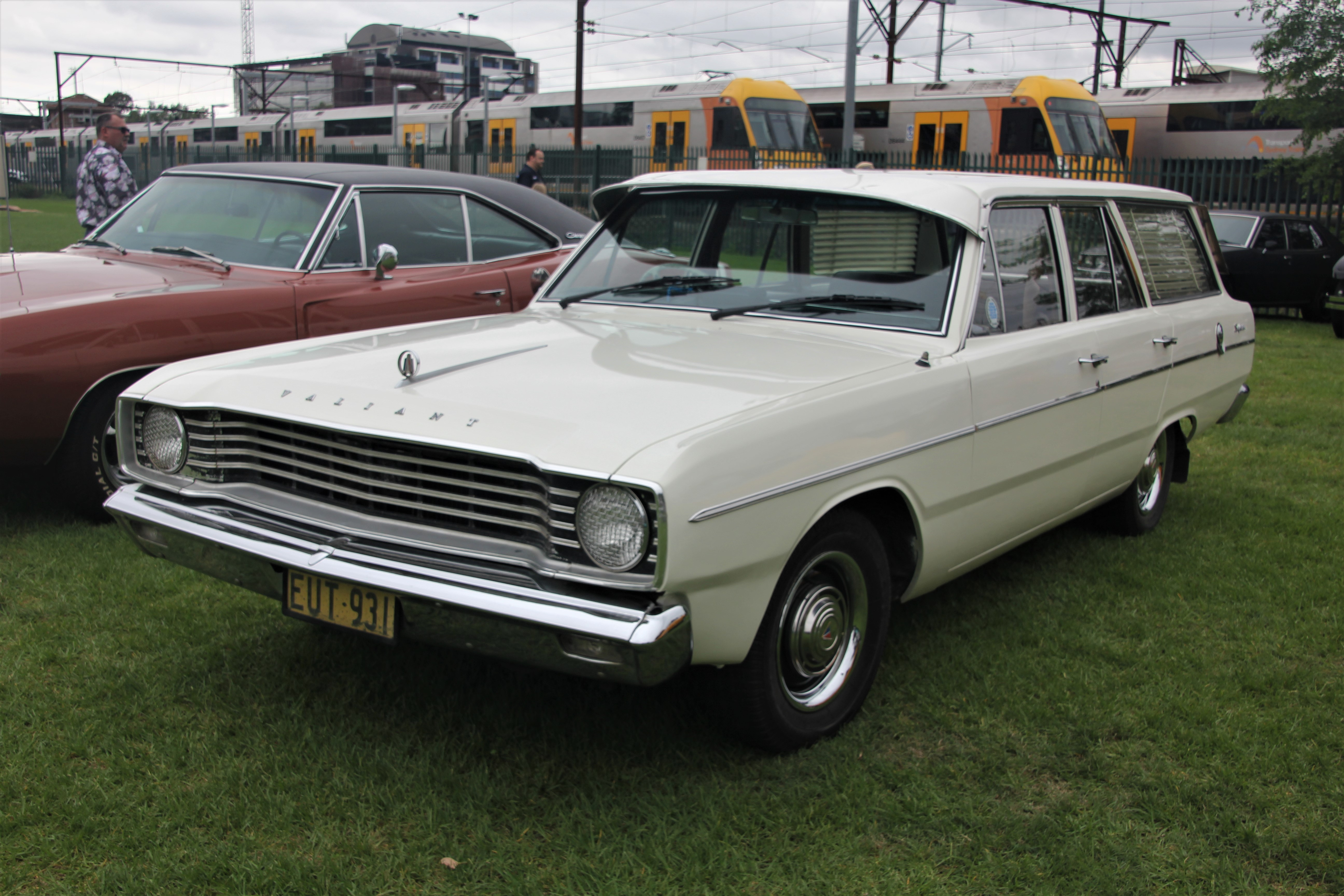
Chrysler VE Valiant Safari wagon

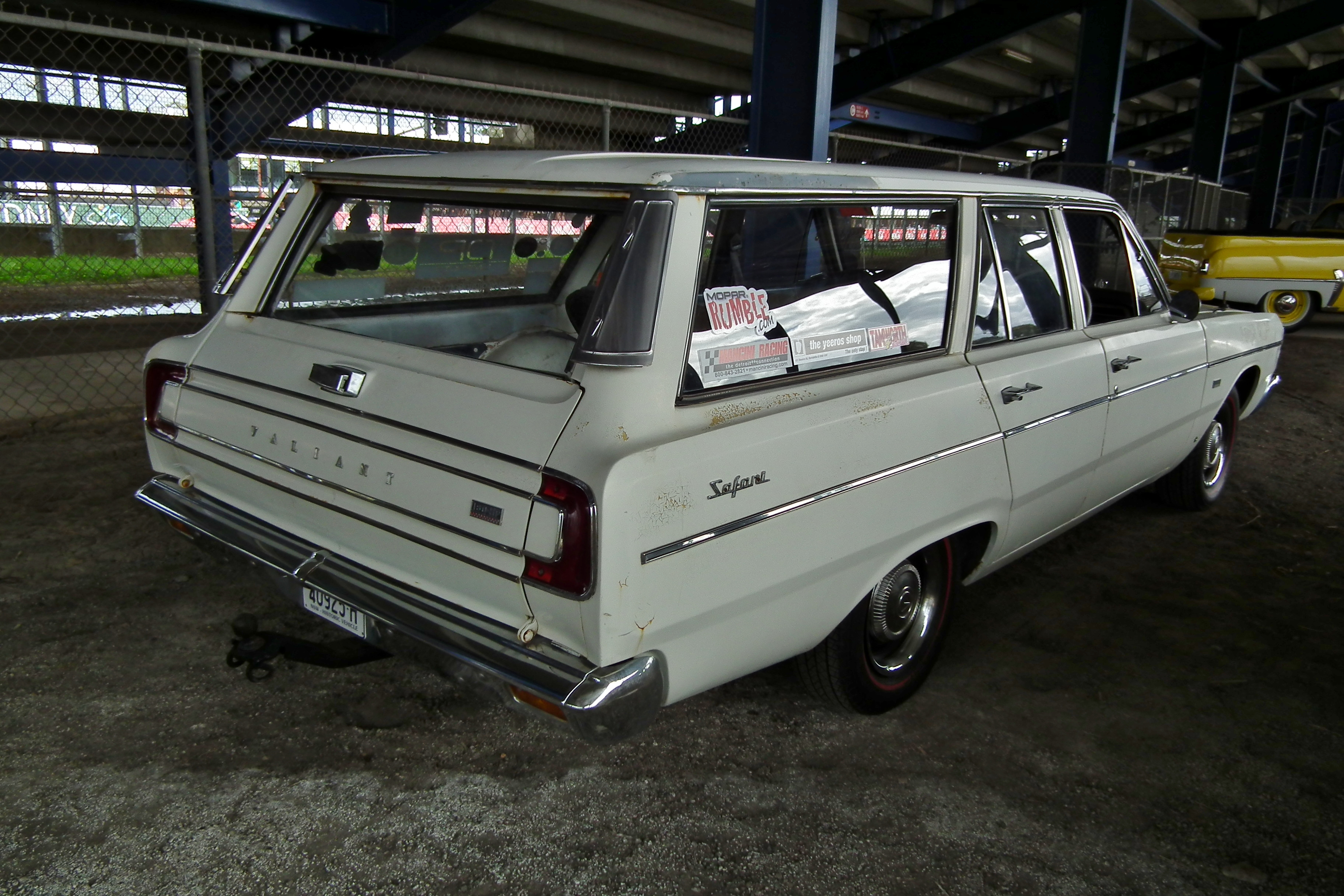
Chrysler VE Valiant Safari wagon

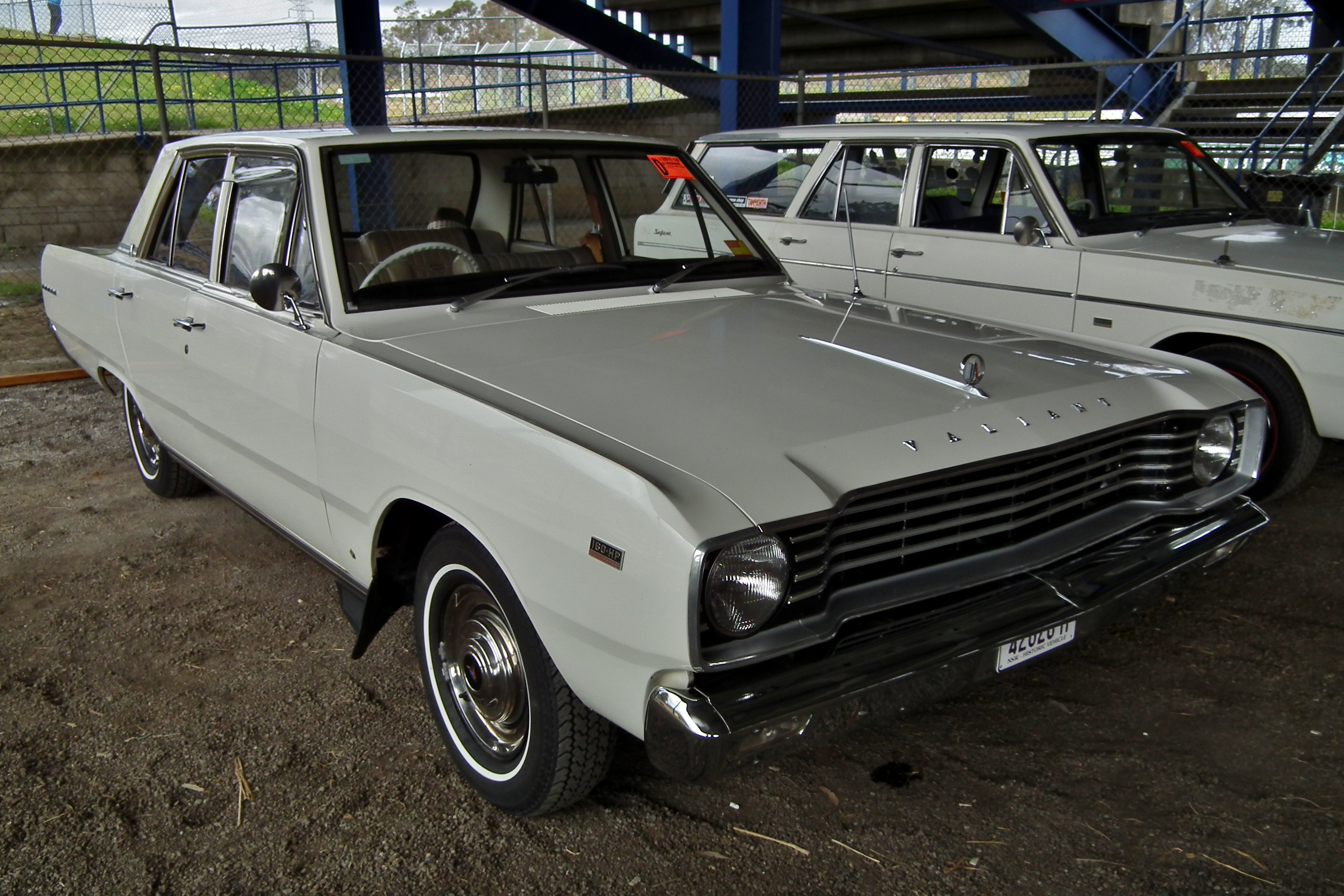
Chrysler VE Valiant Regal sedan

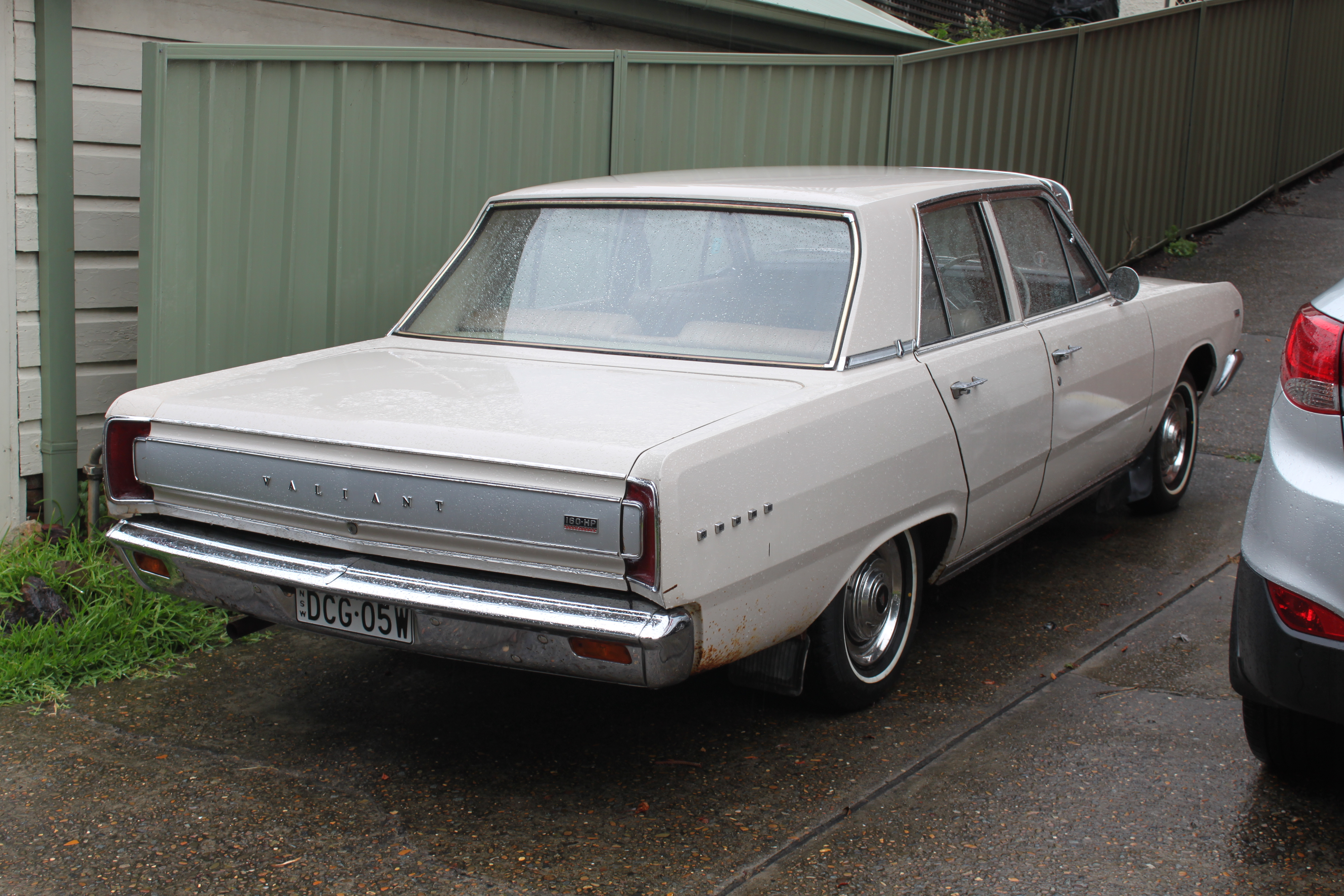
Chrysler VE Valiant Regal sedan

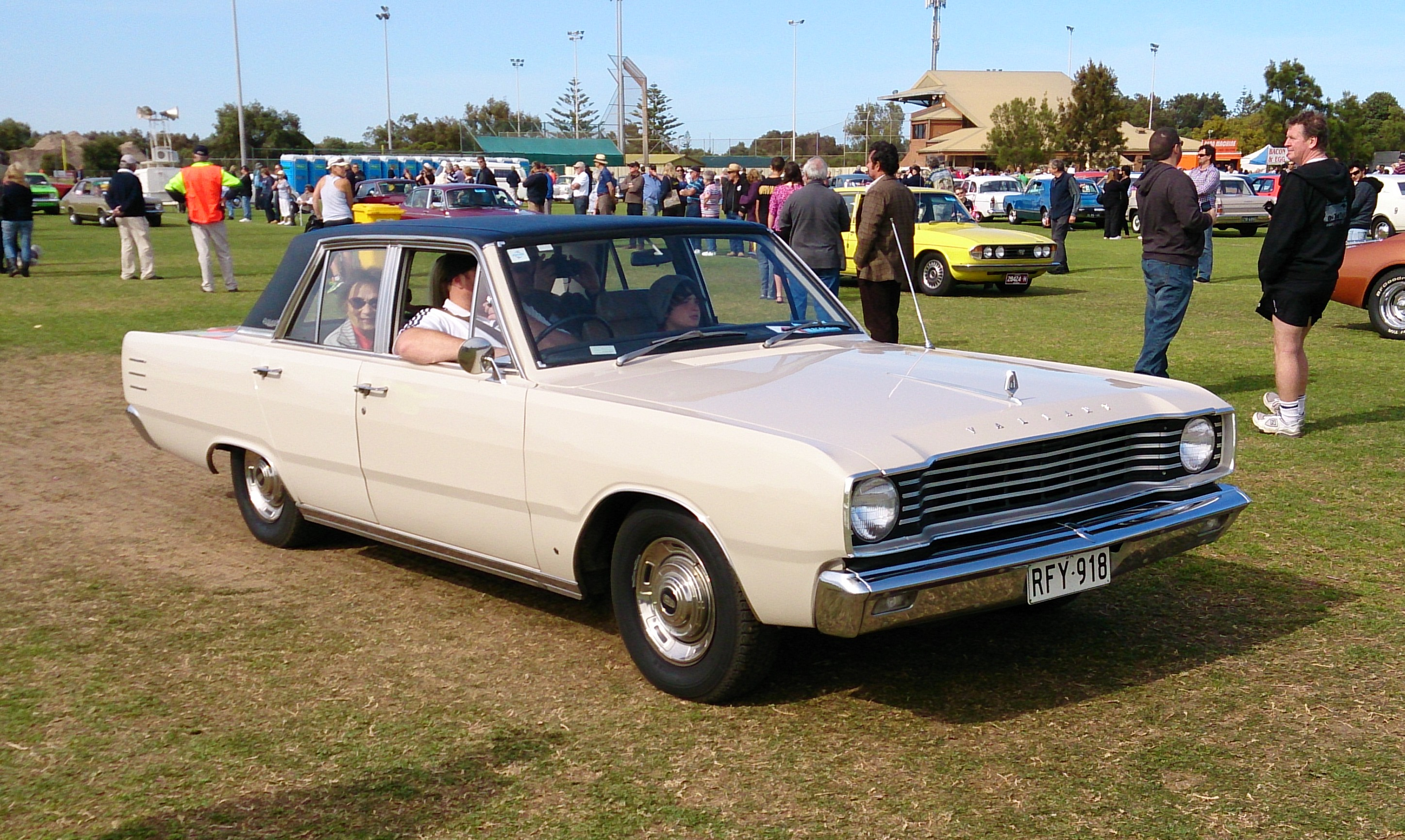
Chrysler VE Valiant VIP sedan

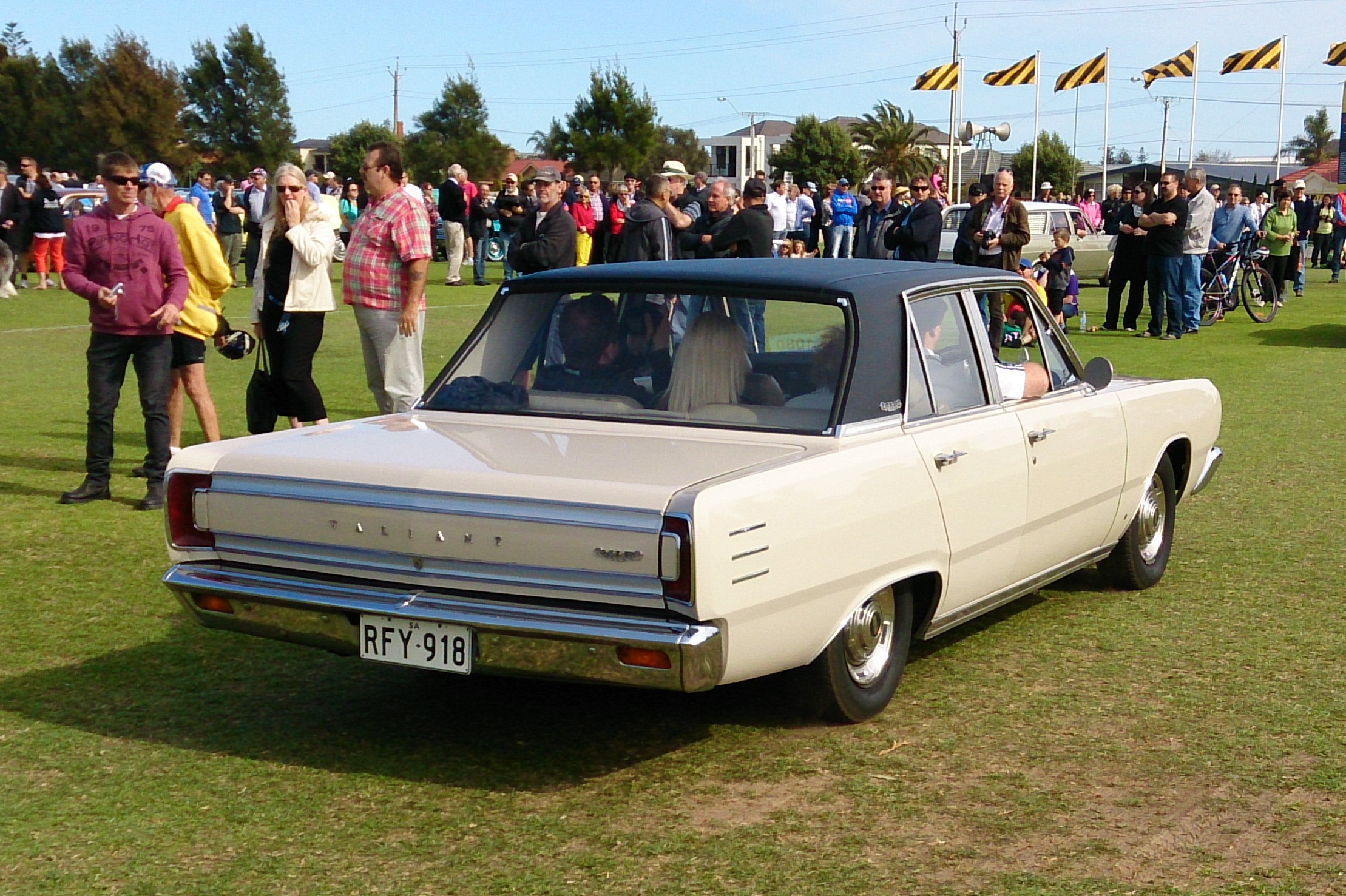
Chrysler VE Valiant VIP sedan

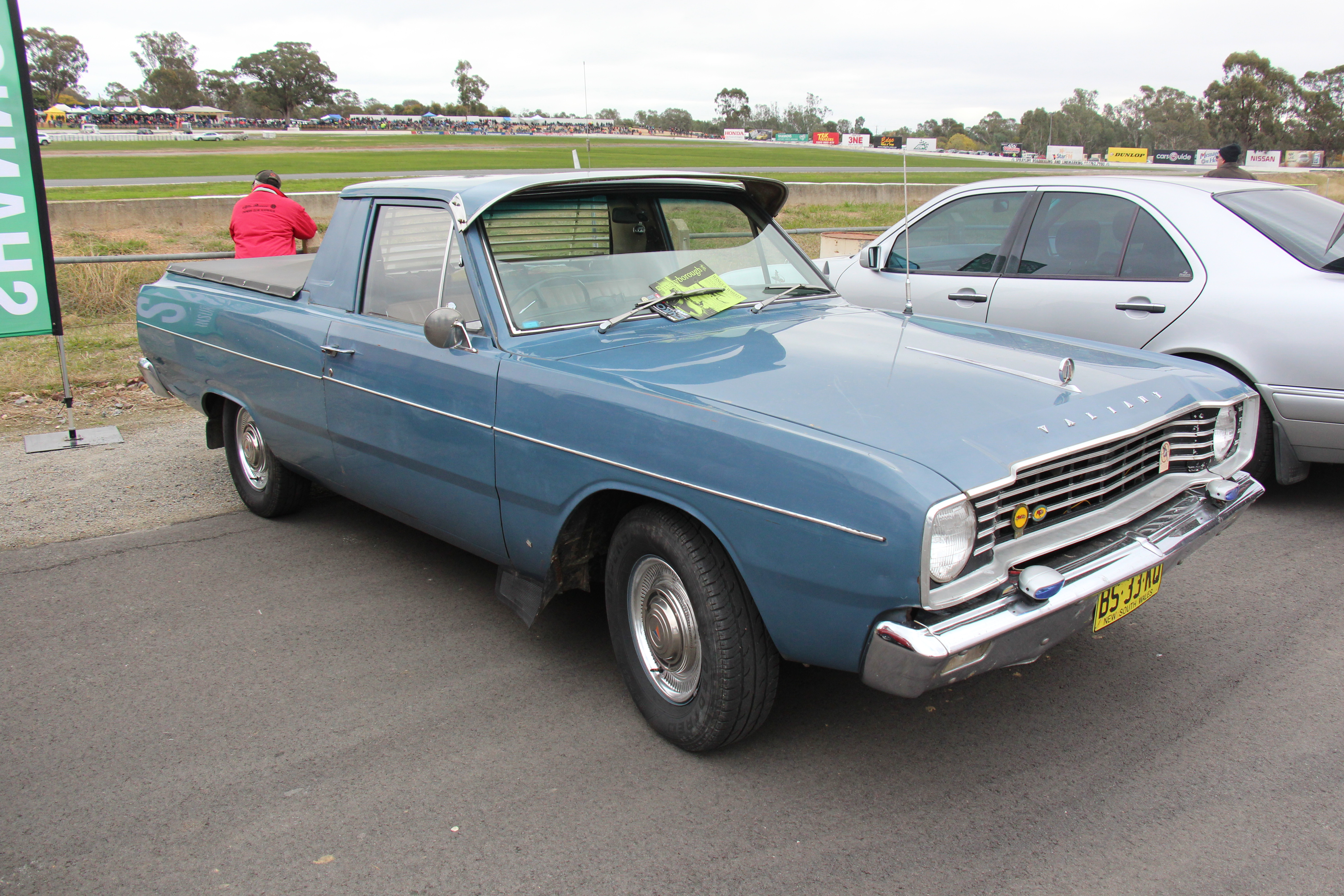
Chrysler VE Valiant utility

=== Dodge utility ===
A variant of the Valiant utility was marketed as the Dodge utility. (VE-E20) The Dodge was equipped with painted grille and bumpers unlike the chromed examples fitted to VE Valiants.

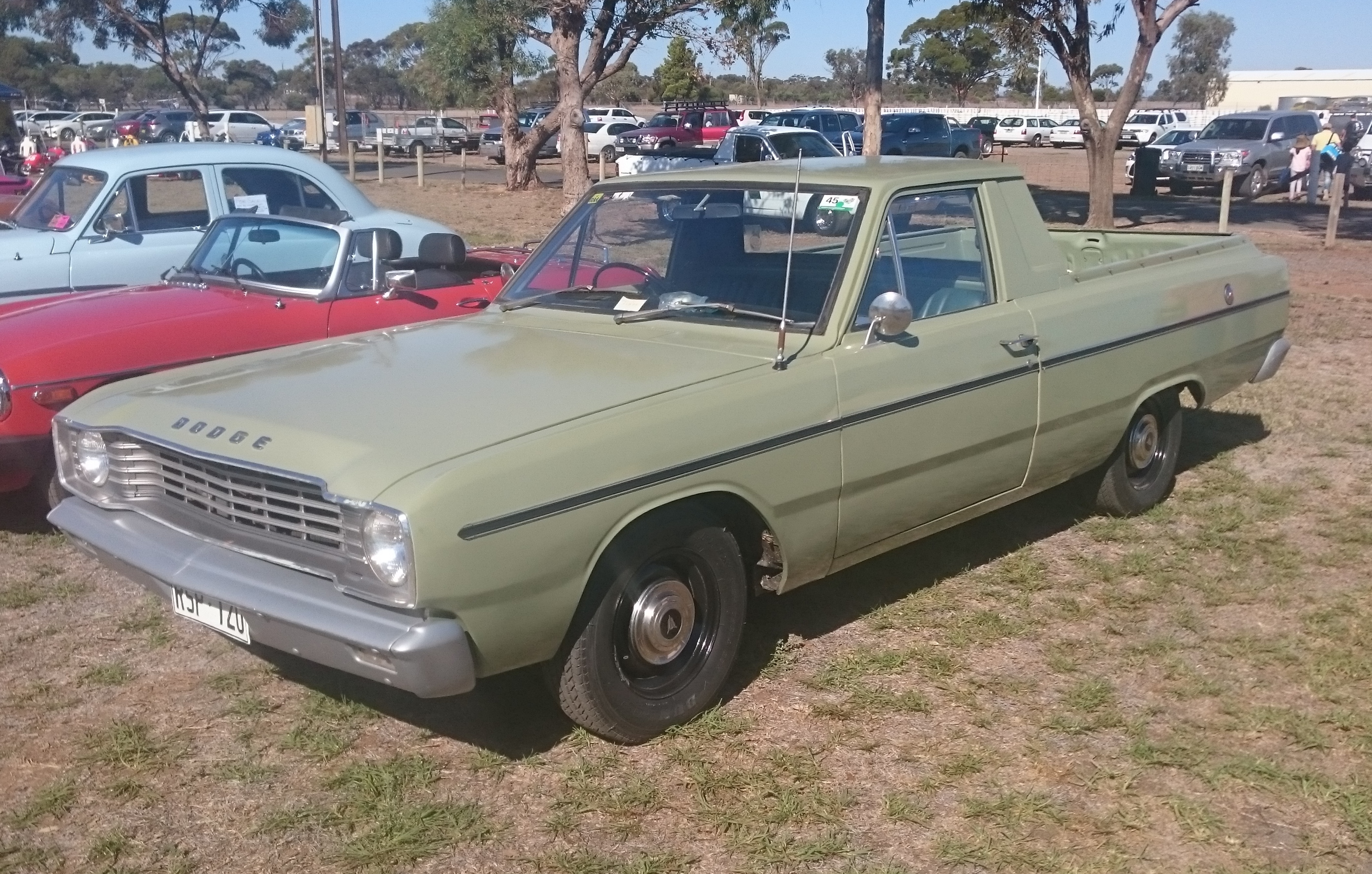
Dodge VE utility

== Changes ==
The VE Valiant was larger than any previous Valiant model. Styling was based on that of the U.S Dodge Dart and Plymouth Valiant models with no body panels carried over from the VC Valiant. While the styling from the A-pillar back was Australian-influenced, sheeting forward of the A-pillar and bonnet was that of the U.S. Dart/Valiant models with the exception of the grille which was convex on the Australian models as opposed to concave on the U.S. models. Also new in the VE range were dual-line brakes, double-sided safety wheel rims, front safety belts and power-assisted front disc brakes on V8 models. The Valiant VIP (four-door performance model) was offered for the first time, the new model featuring the V8 engine, automatic transmission, power steering, front disc brakes and reclining front seats.

Chrysler Australia continued to build Valiant station wagons which Plymouth in the United States had otherwise ceased production of in 1967.

== Engines and transmissions ==
A 145 bhp 225 cu in (3.7 L) Straight-six, a 160 bhp 225 cu in (3.7 L) "High Performance" Straight-six and a 195 bhp 273 cu in (4.5 L) V8 engine were available, the VE being the first series to be offered with a choice of three engines. Three speed manual and three-speed "Torque-Flite" automatic transmissions were offered. The V8 engine and automatic transmission were standard on the VIP.

== Awards ==
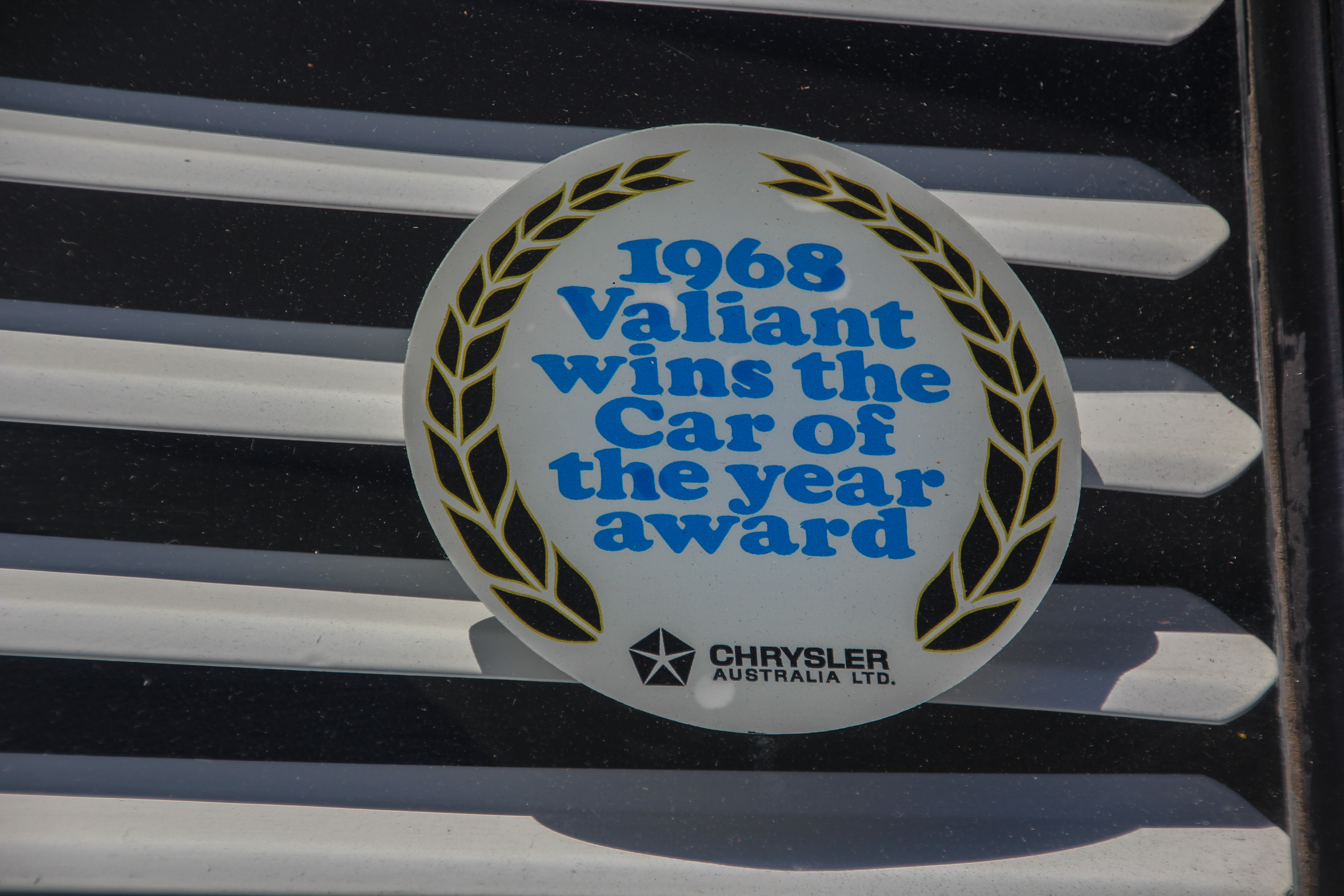
Window sticker as fitted to VE Valiants after winning the 1968 Wheels Magazine Car of the Year award

The VE Valiant was announced as the winner of the Wheels magazine Car of the Year award in January 1968.

== Production and replacement ==
A total of 68,688 VE Valiants were built prior to its replacement by the VF Valiant range in March 1969.

== See also ==
- Chrysler Valiant
