= AMC Javelin =

Compact car produced by American Motors Corporation

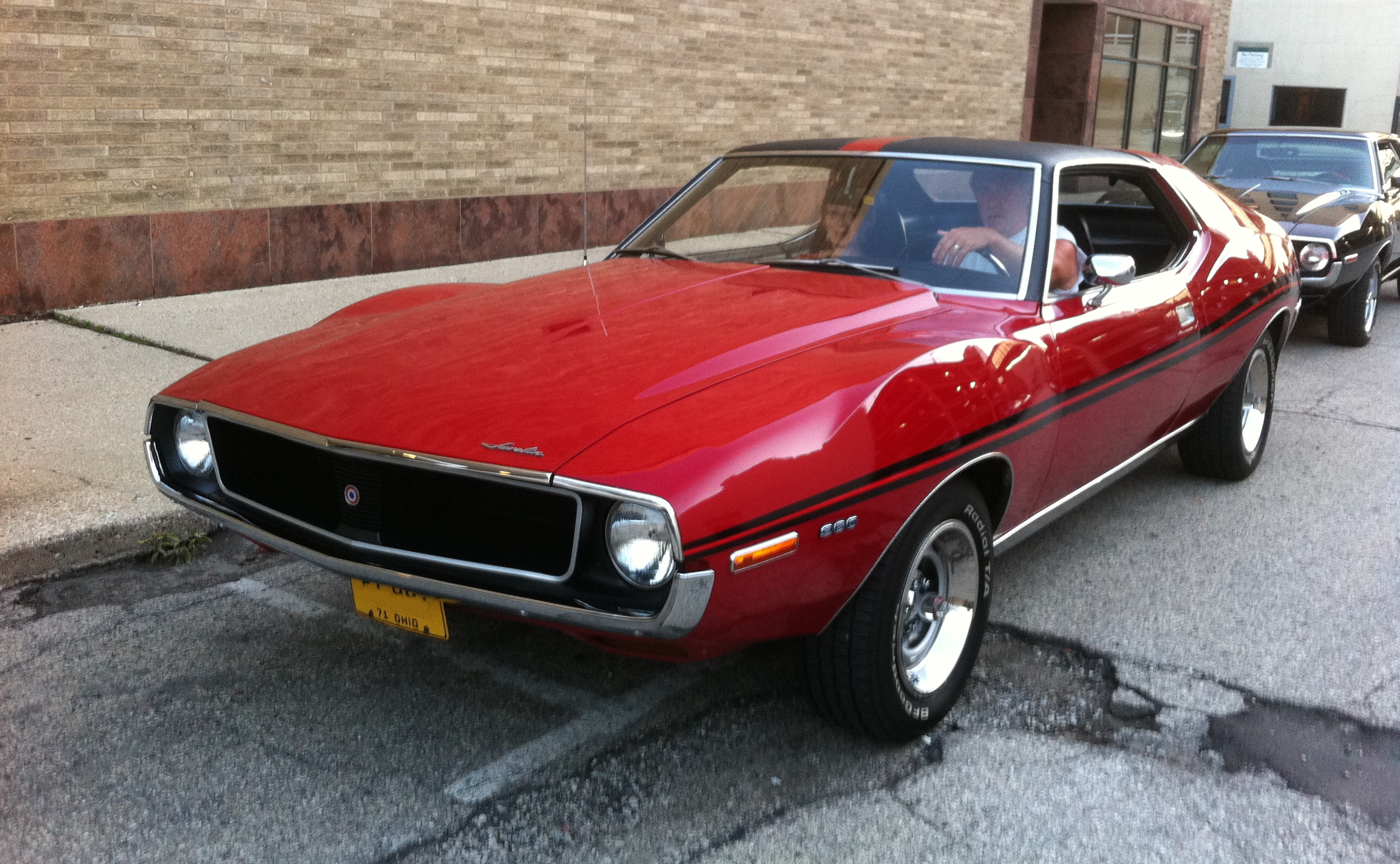
- 1971 AMC Javelin SST

Overview
- Manufacturer: American Motors Corporation (AMC)
- Also called: Rambler Javelin (Australia, Venezuela & United Kingdom); Javelin 79-K (Europe); VAM Javelin (Mexico)
- Production: 1967–1974
- Model years: 1968–1974
- Assembly: United States: Kenosha, Wisconsin; Australia: Port Melbourne (AMI); Canada: Brampton, Ontario; Germany: Osnabrück (Karmann); Mexico: Mexico City (VAM); Philippines: Manila (Luzon Machineries); Venezuela: Caracas
- Designer: Dick Teague

Body and chassis
- Class: Pony car; Muscle car
- Body style: 2-door hardtop
- Layout: FR layout
- Platform: AMC’s "junior" cars

Chronology
- Predecessor: Rambler Marlin

The AMC Javelin is an American front-engine, rear-wheel-drive, two-door hardtop automobile manufactured by American Motors Corporation (AMC) across two generations, 1968 through 1970 and 1971 through 1974 model years. The car was positioned and marketed in the pony car market segment.

Styled by Dick Teague, the Javelin was available in a range of trim and engine levels, from economical pony car to muscle car variants. In addition to manufacture in Kenosha, Wisconsin, Javelins were assembled under license in Germany, Mexico, Philippines, Venezuela, as well as Australia – and were marketed globally. American Motors also offered discounts to U.S. military personnel, and cars were taken overseas.

The Javelin won the Trans-Am race series in 1971, 1972, and 1976. The second-generation AMX variant was the first pony car used as a standard vehicle for highway police car duties by an American law enforcement agency.

== Development ==
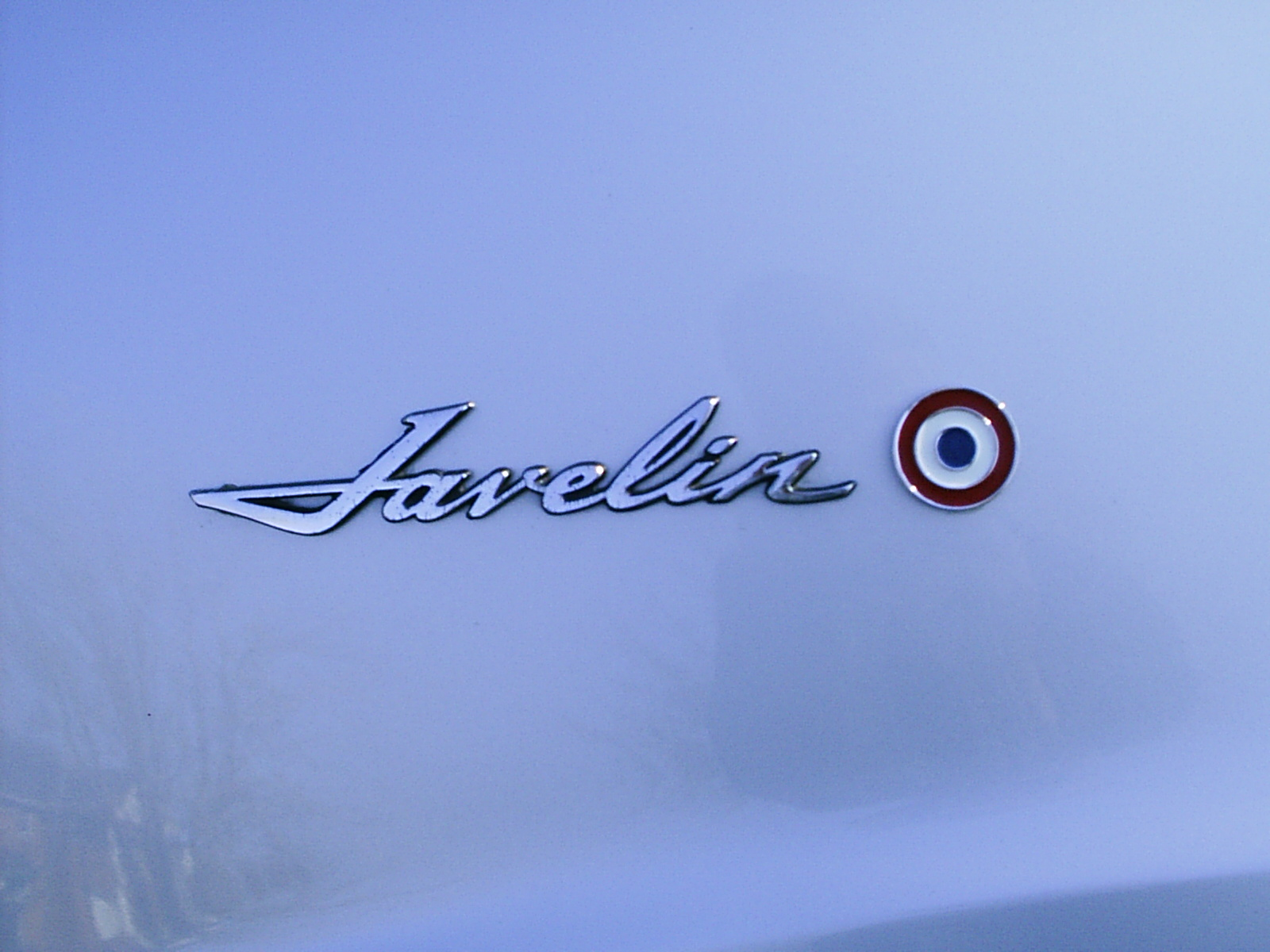
AMC Javelin badge

American Motors' Javelin was the company's entrant into the "pony car" market. The segment was created by the Ford Mustang even if Ford's car was not the first entry. The Javelin's design evolved from two prototype cars named AMX that were shown in AMC's "Project IV" auto show circuit during 1966. One was a fiberglass two-seat "AMX", and the other was a four-seat "AMX II". These offerings reflected the company's strategy to shed its "economy car" image and appeal to a more youthful, performance-oriented market.

Sales of convertibles were dropping, and AMC did not have the resources to design separate fastback and notchback hardtops that were available on the Mustang and the second-generation Plymouth Barracuda, so the AMC styling team led by Dick Teague penned only one body style, "a smooth semi-fastback roofline that helped set Javelin apart from other pony cars."

The Javelin was built on AMC's "junior" (compact) Rambler American platform only as a two-door hardtop model to be a "hip", dashing, affordable pony car, as well as available in muscle car performance versions. "Despite management's insistence on things like good trunk space and rear-seat room, Teague managed to endow the Javelin with what he termed the wet T-shirt look: voluptuous curves with nary a hint of fat."

== First generation ==
1968 and 1969
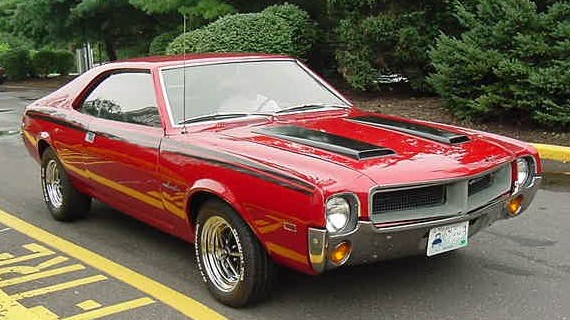
- 1968 AMC Javelin base model

Overview
- Also called: Rambler Javelin (Australia); VAM Javelin (Mexico)
- Production: August 1967 – July 1969
- Designer: Dick Teague

Body and chassis
- Related: AMC AMX

Powertrain
- Engine: 232 cu in (3.8 L) I6 145 hp (108 kW; 147 PS) 1-bbl or 155 hp (116 kW; 157 PS) 2-bbl; 252 cu in (4.1 L) I6 170 hp (127 kW; 172 PS) 2-bbl (1969, Mexico only); 290 cu in (4.8 L) V8 2-bbl 225 hp (168 kW; 228 PS); 343 cu in (5.6 L) V8 235 hp (175 kW; 238 PS) 2-bbl or 280 hp (209 kW; 284 PS) 4-bbl; 390 cu in (6.4 L) V8 315 hp (235 kW; 319 PS)
- Transmission: 3-speed manual; 4-speed manual; 3-speed automatic; 3-speed "Shift-Command" on console

Dimensions
- Wheelbase: 109 in (2,769 mm)
- Length: 189.2 in (4,806 mm)
- Width: 71.9 in (1,826 mm)
- Height: 51.8 in (1,315.7 mm)
- Curb weight: 2,836 lb (1,286.4 kg)

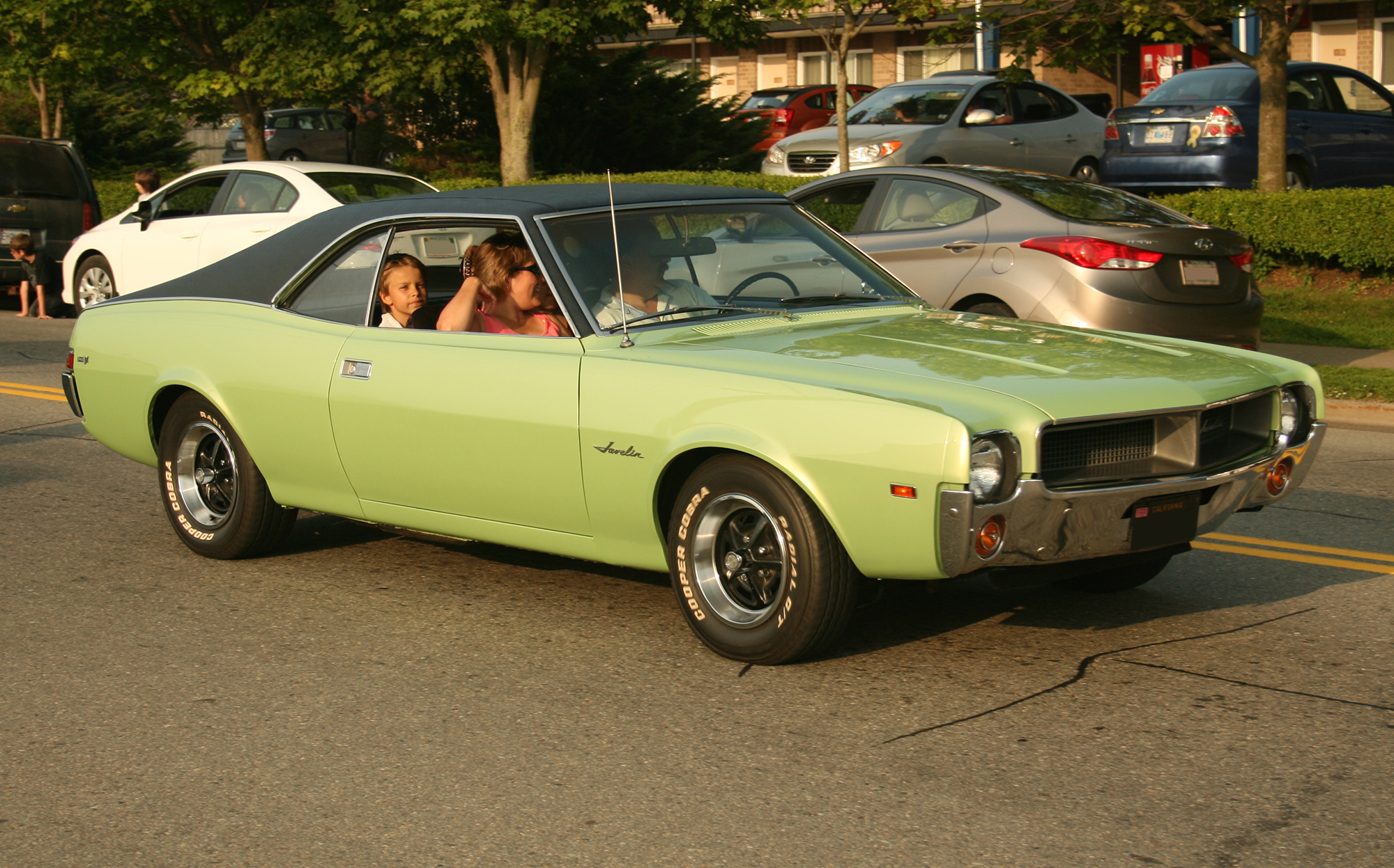
1968 AMC Javelin

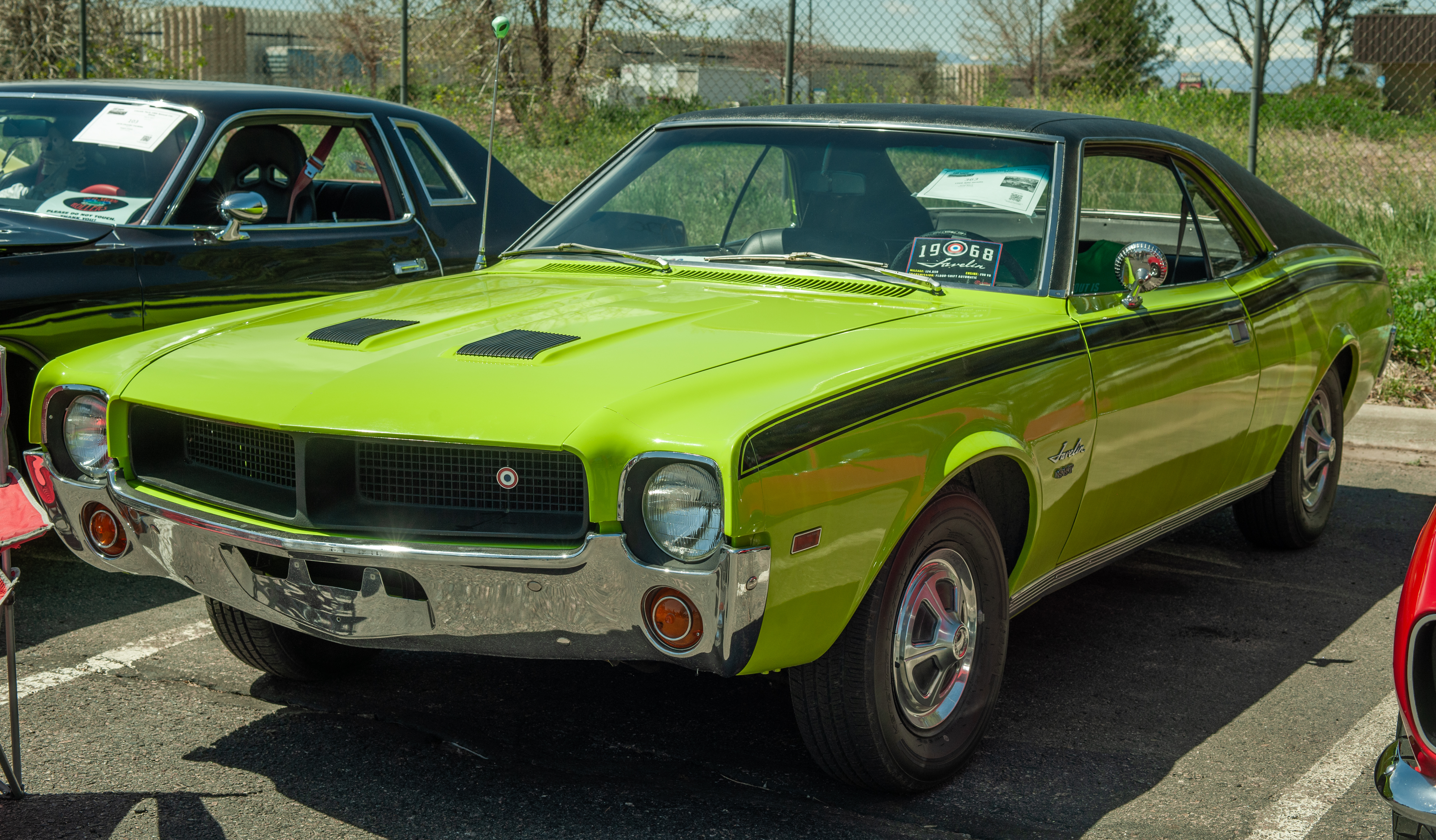
1968 AMC Javelin SST

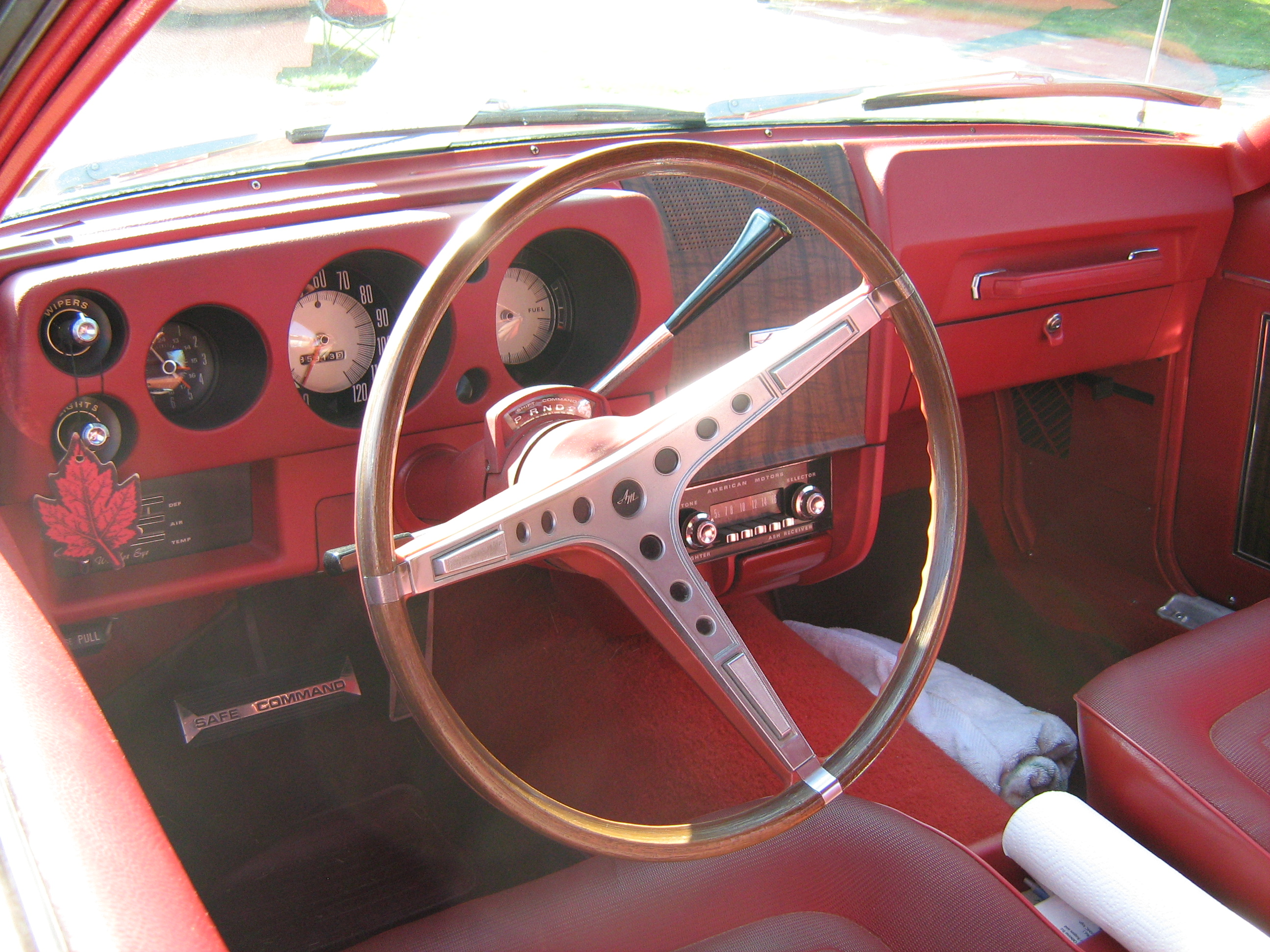
SST interior

The Javelin debuted on 22 August 1967, for the 1968 model year, and the new models were offered for sale from 26 September 1967, with prices starting at $2,743.

The car incorporated several safety innovations, including interior windshield posts that were "the first industry use of fiberglass safety padding", and the flush-mounted paddle-style door handles. To comply with National Highway Traffic Safety Administration (NHTSA) safety standards there were exterior side marker lights, and three-point seat belts and headrests for the front seats. The interior was devoid of bright trim to help reduce glare.

American Motors marketed the Javelin as offering "comfortable packaging with more interior and luggage space than most of its rivals" with adequate leg- and headroom in the back and a trunk capacity of 10.2 cubic feet (288.83 L). There were no side vent windows. Flow-through ventilation extracted interior air through apertures in the doors controlled by adjustable flap valves at the door armrests' bottom. All Javelins came with thin-shell bucket seats and a fully carpeted interior. The SST model added appearance and comfort features, including reclining front seatbacks with upgraded upholstery, simulated wood-grained door panel trim, a sports-style steering wheel, and bright exterior trim for the drip rail and rocker panel. The Javelin's instruments and controls were set deep in a padded panel in front of the driver, with the rest of the dashboard set well forward and away from the front passenger.

The car's front end had what AMC called a "twin-venturi" look with a recessed honeycomb grille and outboard-mounted headlamps, and matching turn signals were set into the bumper. A pair of simulated air scoops on the hood and the windshield was raked at 59 degrees for a "sporty overall appearance."

Road & Track magazine compared a Javelin favorably to its competitors on its introduction in 1968, describing its "big, heavy, super-powerful engine" as "an asset in such a small vehicle", and the styling as "pleasant". Motor Trend, putting the Javelin at the top of the "sports-personal" category in its annual "Car of the Year" issue, said it was "the most significant achievement for an all-new car" and "the most notable new entry in [its] class."

Available only in a two-door hardtop, body style, the Javelin came in base and more premium SST models. The standard engine was a 232 cu in (3.8 L) straight-6. Optional were a 290 cu in (4.8 L) V8 with two-barrel carburetor, and a 343 cu in (5.6 L) V8 in regular gasoline two-barrel or high-compression premium-fuel four-barrel versions. Racing driver Gordon Johncock said the Javelin had "a nice, all-round blend of features", that it "stacks up as a roomy, comfortable, peppy and handsome example of a so-called "pony car" and that after his road test, he "wanted to take it home."

With the standard straight-six engine, the Javelin cruised at 80 miles per hour (129 km/h) when equipped with an automatic transmission. In comparison, those with the base 290 cu in (4.8 L) V8 had a top speed of 100 miles per hour (161 km/h). A three-speed "Shift-Command" automatic transmission was optional with a center console-mounted gear selector. Forward settings included "1", "2", and a "D" mode that was fully automatic, and the driver could choose to shift manually through all three gears.

The optional "Go Package" included a four-barrel carbureted 343 cu in (5.6 L) AMC V8, power front disc brakes, heavy-duty suspension, dual exhausts with chromed outlets, broad full-length body-side stripes, and E70x14 red-line tires mounted on chrome-plated "Magnum 500" styled road wheels. A 343 Go Pac Javelin could accelerate from 0 to 60 miles per hour (97 km/h) in 8 seconds, had a top speed approaching 120 miles per hour (193 km/h), and could run a quarter-mile in 15.4 seconds. The largest engine in the first few months of 1968 production was "a 5.6 litre V-8 that delivered 284 SAE bhp, which made the car dangerously fast."

In mid-1968, the new 390 cu in (6.4 L) engine was offered as part of the "Go-package" option with a floor-mounted automatic or manual four-speed transmission. "Its impressive 315 hp (235 kW; 319 PS) and 425 pound force-feet (576 N⋅m) of torque could send the Javelin from zero to 60 miles per hour (97 km/h) in the seven-second range."

American Motors supported the AMX and the Javelin muscle versions with a range of factory-approved "Group 19" dealer-installed performance accessories. These parts included, among others, dual four-barrel cross-ram intake manifolds, high-performance camshaft kits, needle-bearing roller rocker arms, and dual-point ignition.

The average age of the "first 1,000 Javelin buyers was 29 – a full ten years under the median for all AMC customers." The Javelin's marketing campaign, created by Mary Wells Lawrence of the Wells, Rich, and Greene agency was innovative and daring in its approach. Print and TV advertisements broke with the traditional convention of not attacking the competition, and some compared the AMC Javelin to the Ford Mustang side by side, as well as showing the Mustang being beaten to pieces with sledgehammers.

The car was longer and roomier than the Ford Mustang and Chevrolet Camaro, but not the size of the larger Plymouth Barracuda. Comparison testing of six 1968 pony cars by Car and Driver described the Javelin as having "a clean understated appearance that is not marred by phony vents, power bulges, mounds or bizarre sculpturing of whatever variety. The Javelin is an honest-looking car with a dramatic flair."

Total production for the 1968 model year was 55,125.

=== 1969 ===
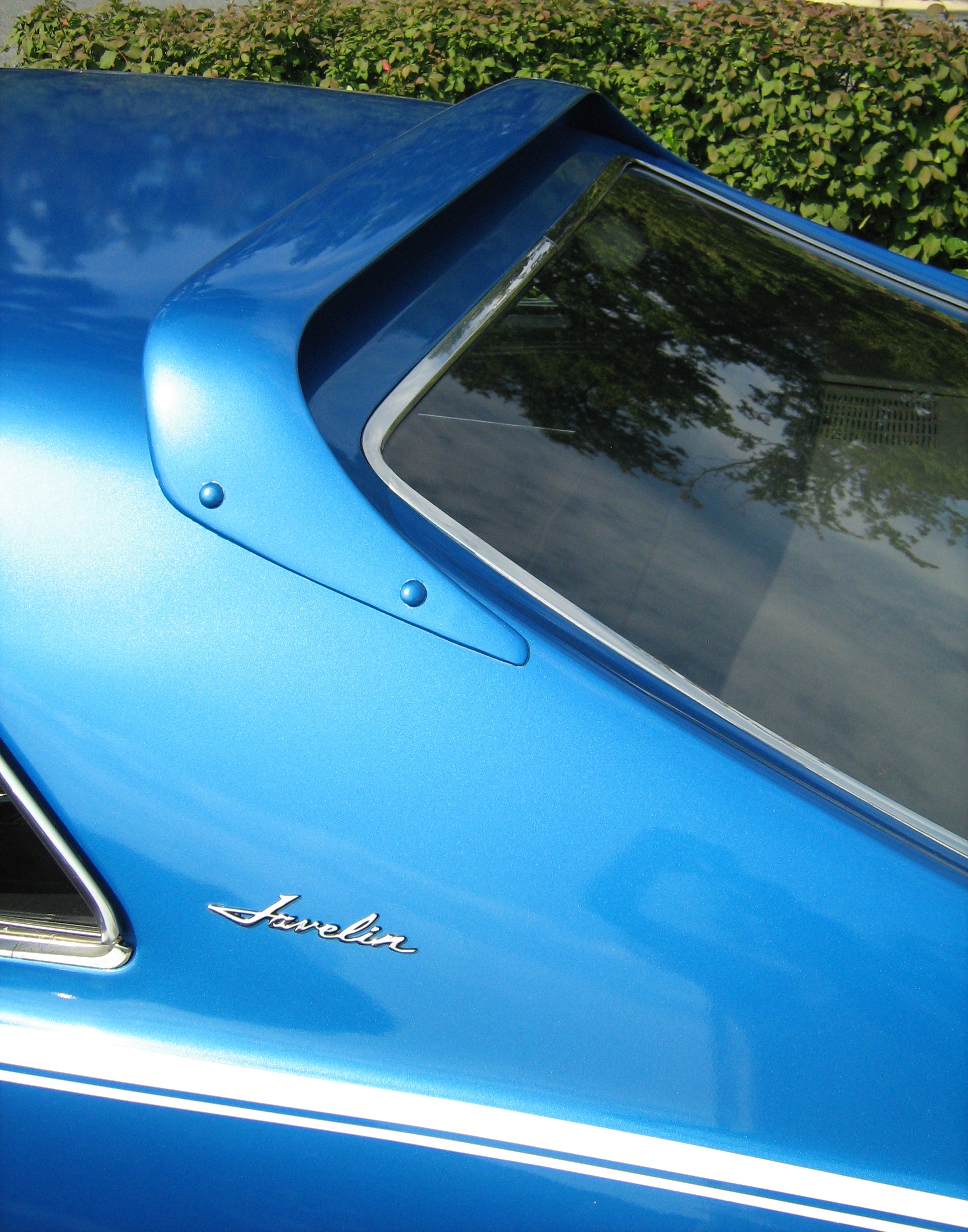
Breedlove roof spoiler

Minor changes for the second model year included revised side striping, an altered grille with a bull's eye emblem, and trim upgrades. An optional side-stripe package consisted of a C-shaped graphic that started behind the front wheel openings. The optional (standard with the "Go-Package") five-spoke Magnum 500 steel road wheels now came with a stainless steel trim ring. The interior received new door panels and upgraded carpeting. Instrumentation featured a 0–8,000 rpm tachometer that now matched the speedometer in style. Late model-year production received a cowl over the instrument panel directly before the driver.

The "Mod Javelin" Package was introduced mid-year in 1969. It included a "Craig Breedlove" roof-mounted spoiler, simulated "exhaust" rocker trim, and twin blacked-out simulated air scoops on the hood. Optional "Big Bad" paint (neon brilliant blue, orange, or green) also became available from mid-1969. It came with matching front and rear painted bumpers, as well as two vertical rubber-faced painted bumper guards for the rear and a bright lower grille molding on the painted front bumper. This was part of AMC's targeting youthful consumers as they were "dumping the drab." These bright colors were available on all Javelins through 1970.

The Go-Package option was available with the four-barrel 343 or 390 engines and continued to include disc brakes, "Twin-Grip" limited-slip differential, red-line performance E70x14 tires on "Magnum 500" styled wheels, heavy-duty suspension with thicker sway-bars, and other enhancements. Starting in January 1969, the four-speed manual transmissions included a Hurst floor shifter (AMC's version of the Hurst Competition Plus model) to provide shorter throws between gears and make it feel firmer and more solid.

The production total for the 1969 model year was 40,675.

1969 AMC Javelin

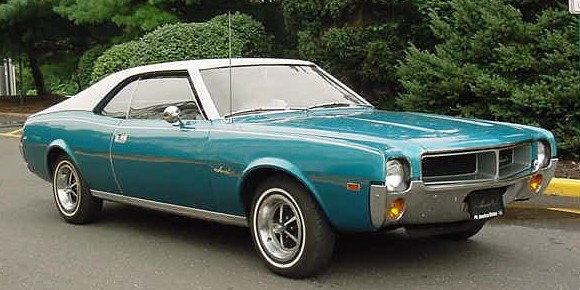
SST with vinyl-covered roof and "Magnum 500" wheels

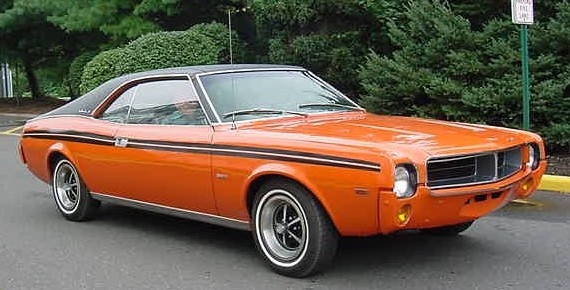
"Big Bad Orange" with full-length bodyside stripes

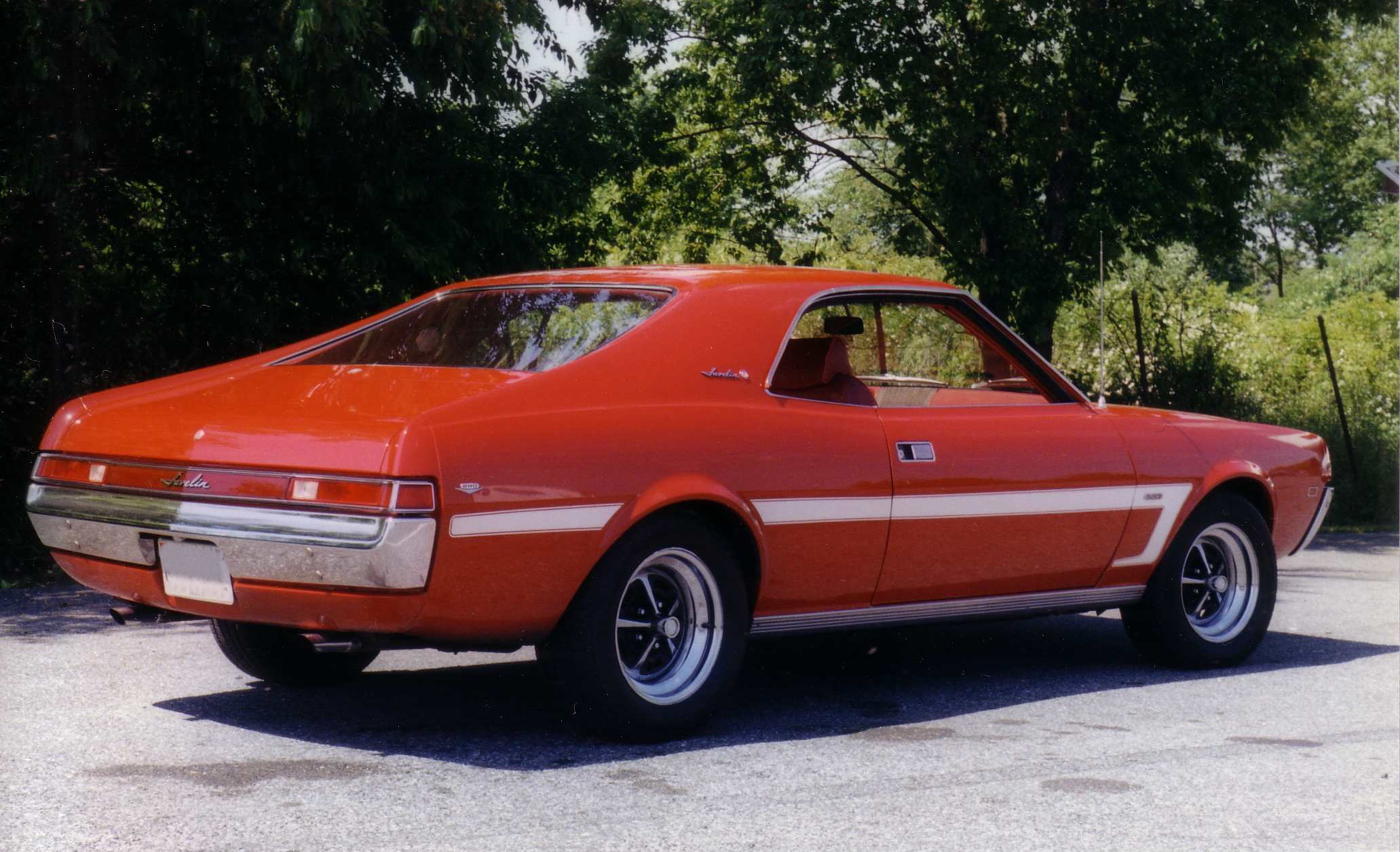
SST with white "C" stripe

=== Racing ===
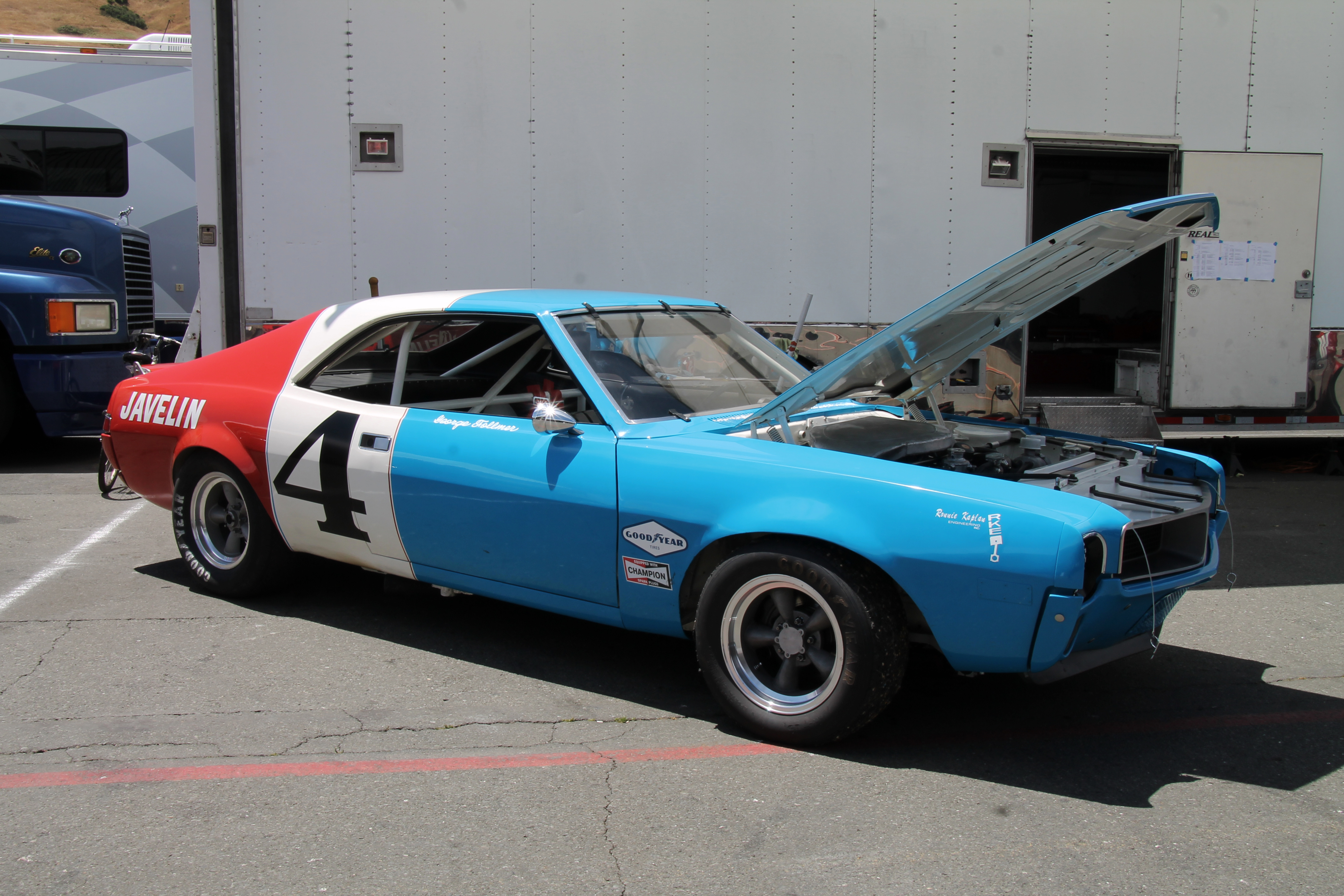
George Follmer's 1968 AMC Javelin

American Motors entered the Javelin in dragstrip and Trans-Am Series racing.

Carl Chakmakian was the primary contact for the AMC racing program. In 1968, AMC contracted Kaplan Engineering (Ron Kaplan and Jim Jeffords) to campaign two AMC Javelins in the SCCA's Trans-Am series. For the 1968 season, three cars were prepared: two for racing and one for shows and demonstrations.

The first year of the AMC program was a success; journalists described the team as a "Cinderella" team. American Motors placed third in the over-2-liter class of the 1968 series, and established a record as the only factory entry to finish every Trans-Am race entered.

During the 1968 season, the team consistently improved and suffered only one "did not finish" (DNF) because of an engine problem. The race program was supporting a company with no performance parts, test facility, or technical support for the program. Production cars Javelins had no anti-dive potential built into the uni-body and only single-barrel carburetor manifolds.

The team's performance in 1968 was due to the efforts of Kaplan, his staff, and help from other West Coast manufacturers. Kaplan set out to resolve handling problems and fix engine oiling problems. Mid-season, he also started the development of a dual-carburetor cross-ram manifold and (looking ahead) a new engine casting.

The development of the Watt's linkage rear suspension came first. The front anti-dive geometry followed quickly. Kaplan copied the basic design of the inner fender components from a Mustang. He added two more degrees of anti-dive to the Mustang's 4 degrees, made the drawings, and sent them to the factory. Central Stamping constructed the parts that Kaplan incorporated into the cars as bodies in white. Other suspension parts were acquired through specialty manufacturers.

The building of reliable and powerful engines took more time. The team started the 1968 season with two engines from TRACO. They worked to resolve oiling issues and develop as much power as possible; the single-carb layout and the basic two-bolt-main block were limitations. Kaplan went to Vic Edelbrock to develop a cross-ram manifold. Champion spark plugs provided their dyno room.

Towards the end of 1968, Kaplan enlisted help from Dan Byer, a retired engineer from AMC, to develop a new block casting. Using AMC 390 engineering drawings, they added more mass for four-bolt mains and improved the oiling system. A run of 50 blocks was contracted to Central Foundries in Windsor, Ontario. Because this was a small run, and there was little factory support, it fell to Kaplan and his staff to clean up the blocks from the sand casting, hone the various passages, and, finally, send them to AMC's "Parts Central" in Kenosha. From there, they could draw on the inventory. The blocks were painted bright orange. Kaplan drew on about 12 special castings during the development program, two sold to customers.

Kaplan's preparations included shaving the deck on the new block by about 5/8-inch and heavily modifying the ports. The new cross-ram manifold was installed, and Kaplan would add his specifically designed pistons, a shorter throw crankshaft, and a new camshaft. While a few engines were lost during testing, the design proved reliable.

In the intervening period, AMC replaced Kaplan's race program contact with two new men (Chris Schoenlip and John Voelbel from Lever Brothers, who still needed to gain experience in the automotive field and racing. The two new employees did not enter the parts into the official AMC parts system and submit homologation papers. Kaplan sent the first car to run at the first race of the 1969 season in Jackson, Michigan. It was one of the older 1968 cars with a new engine, but because they were late and had not qualified, the team had to do some consensus-building among the other racers to permit them to enter. When the SCCA agreed to let them run, they started last, but within ten laps, they were chasing Donohue, and the time differential was narrowing rapidly. After the race, the SCCA asked to see the engine, but he had already sent the cars home. At Lime Rock, the SCCA wanted to tear down the engines before they could start the race. Kaplan bought some time by countering the challenge that they also had to tear down the Camaros and Mustangs. That was not going to happen, so they were allowed to run. However, problems with the SCCA would continue until the parts could be homologated. AMC eventually assigned a part number.

For 1969, the season began with Ron Grable (#4) and John Martin (#3). This time, it was Martin who was released mid-season. Jerry Grant replaced him in the No. 3 car.

At this point, Kaplan approached AMC management and proposed modifying the concept behind the 1969 contract. He suggested that AMC should not compete in the actual races since the new engines were not recognized and the old engines needed to be competitive. Kaplan suggested that they instead go to the tracks on the subsequent Mondays and run a developmental program using Sunday's winning times as the benchmark. AMC disagreed, and Kaplan ran the year with the engines on hand. The results could have been better because the older-style engines were not competitive. There were also budget cuts.

After the final race at Riverside, Kaplan dropped all of AMC's material at their zone office in El Segundo, California, and took a month to think about the following year. When he returned, he found that a deal was made with Roger Penske.

Penske picked up the team cars and equipment from the El Segundo offices and shipped everything back to his shop in Pennsylvania. Through the fall of 1969 and into the winter, Penske used the no. 3 Jerry Grant car for developmental purposes. When he acquired the 1969 cars, Penske found that Ron Kaplan had already done considerable work with suspension, but he felt the front suspension could be better. With Mark Donohue doing the testing, Penske's team lowered the front of the car and replaced the rubber bushings in the radius rods with heim joints. New roll bars were also developed. After several months of development, Donohue felt the team now had a car that drove like it was on rails.

At this point, Penske built all-new cars for his team and sold all the earlier Kaplan cars and equipment. Mark Donohue was in charge of selling off the inventory.

== Redesign ==
1970
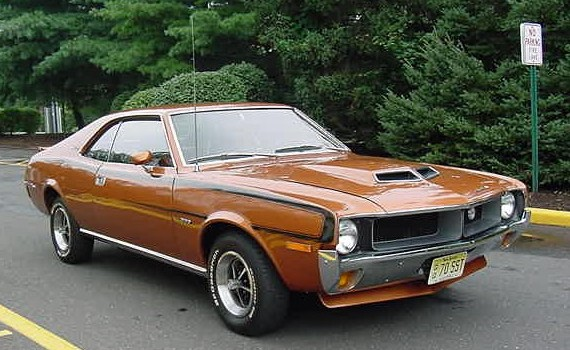
- 1970 AMC Javelin SST with "Go Package"

Overview
- Also called: Rambler Javelin (Australia); VAM Javelin (Mexico)
- Production: August 1969 – July 1970

Powertrain
- Engine: 232 cu in (3.8 L) I6 145 hp (108 kW; 147 PS) 1-bbl or 155 hp (116 kW; 157 PS) 2-bbl; 252 cu in (4.1 L) I6 170 hp (127 kW; 172 PS) 2-bbl (Mexico only); 304 cu in (5.0 L) V8 2-bbl 225 hp (168 kW; 228 PS); 360 cu in (5.9 L) V8 245 hp (183 kW; 248 PS) 2-bbl or 285 hp (213 kW; 289 PS) 4-bbl; 390 cu in (6.4 L) V8 325 hp (242 kW; 330 PS)
- Transmission: 3-speed manual; 4-speed manual; 3-speed automatic; 3-speed "Shift-Command" on console

Dimensions
- Wheelbase: 109 in (2,769 mm)
- Length: 191.04 in (4,852 mm)

=== 1970 ===
The 1970 Javelins were a one-year-only design featuring a new front-end design with a broad "twin-venturi" front grille incorporating the headlamps, a new bumper design without air intakes, smooth front fender extensions, and a longer hood in standard smooth version with twin rectangular stripped bright trim pieces or with a prominent center bulge with non-functional dual air intake trim or a functional Ram Air system with the Go-Package. The previous taillamps with side fender lenses, dual backup lamps, and a center reflector with a Javelin emblem were replaced with full-width lenses, a single central backup light, and the Javelin emblem moved to the right corner of the trunk lid. The side marker light design, now shared by other AMC cars, was more prominent and rectangular, with reflector sections in amber at the front or red at the rear. The exterior rearview mirror featured a new "aero" design. The housing was chrome or matched the car's body color. The three "Big Bad" exterior paints continued to be optional on the 1970 Javelins, but they now came with regular chrome front and rear bumpers.

A new front suspension featured ball joints, upper and lower control arms, coil springs, shock absorbers above the upper control arms, and trailing struts on the lower control arms. The 1970 Javelins also introduced Corning's new safety glass, which was thinner and lighter than standard laminated windshields. This unique glass featured a chemically hardened outer layer. It was produced in Blacksburg, Virginia, in a refitted plant that included tempering, ion exchange, and "fusion process" in new furnaces that Corning had developed to be able to supply to the big automakers.

American Motors changed the engine lineup for 1970 models by introducing two new V8 engines: a base 304 cu in (5.0 L) and an optional 360 cu in (5.9 L) to replace the 290 and the 343 versions. The top optional 390 cu in (6.4 L) continued. However, it was upgraded with new cylinder heads featuring 51 cc combustion chambers and a single 4-barrel Autolite 4300 carburetor, increasing power to 325 bhp (330 PS; 242 kW) at 5000 rpm and maximum torque of 425 lb⋅ft (576 N⋅m) at 3200 rpm. The engine's code remained "X" on the vehicle identification number (VIN). Also new was the "power blister" hood, featuring two large openings as part of a functional cold ram-air induction system; this was included with the "Go Package" option.

Many buyers selected the "Go Package," with the 360 or 390 four-barrel V8 engines. As in prior years, this package included front disc brakes, a dual exhaust system, heavy-duty suspension with an anti-sway bar, improved cooling, 3.54 rear axle ratio, and wide Goodyear white-lettered performance tires on styled road wheels.

The interior for 1970 was also a one-year design featuring a broad dashboard (with a wood-grained overlay on SST models), new center console, revised interior door panel trim, and tall "clamshell" bucket seats with integral headrests available in vinyl, corduroy, or optional leather upholstery. A new two-spoke steering wheel with a "Rim Blow" horn was optional. Console-mounted automatic transmissions featured a new "pistol-grip" shifter.

A comparison road test of four 1970 pony cars by Popular Science described the Javelin's interior as the roomiest with good visibility except for small blind spots in the right rear quarter and over the large hood scoop, while also offering the most trunk capacity of all, measuring 10.2 cubic feet (289 L). It was a close second to the Camaro in terms of ride comfort, while the 360 cu in (5.9 L) engine offered "terrific torque." The Javelin with the four-speed manual transmission was also the quickest of the cars tested, reaching 0 to 60 miles per hour (97 km/h) in 6.8 seconds.

Capitalizing on the Javelin's successes on the race track, AMC began advertising and promoting unique models.

==== Mark Donohue Javelin ====
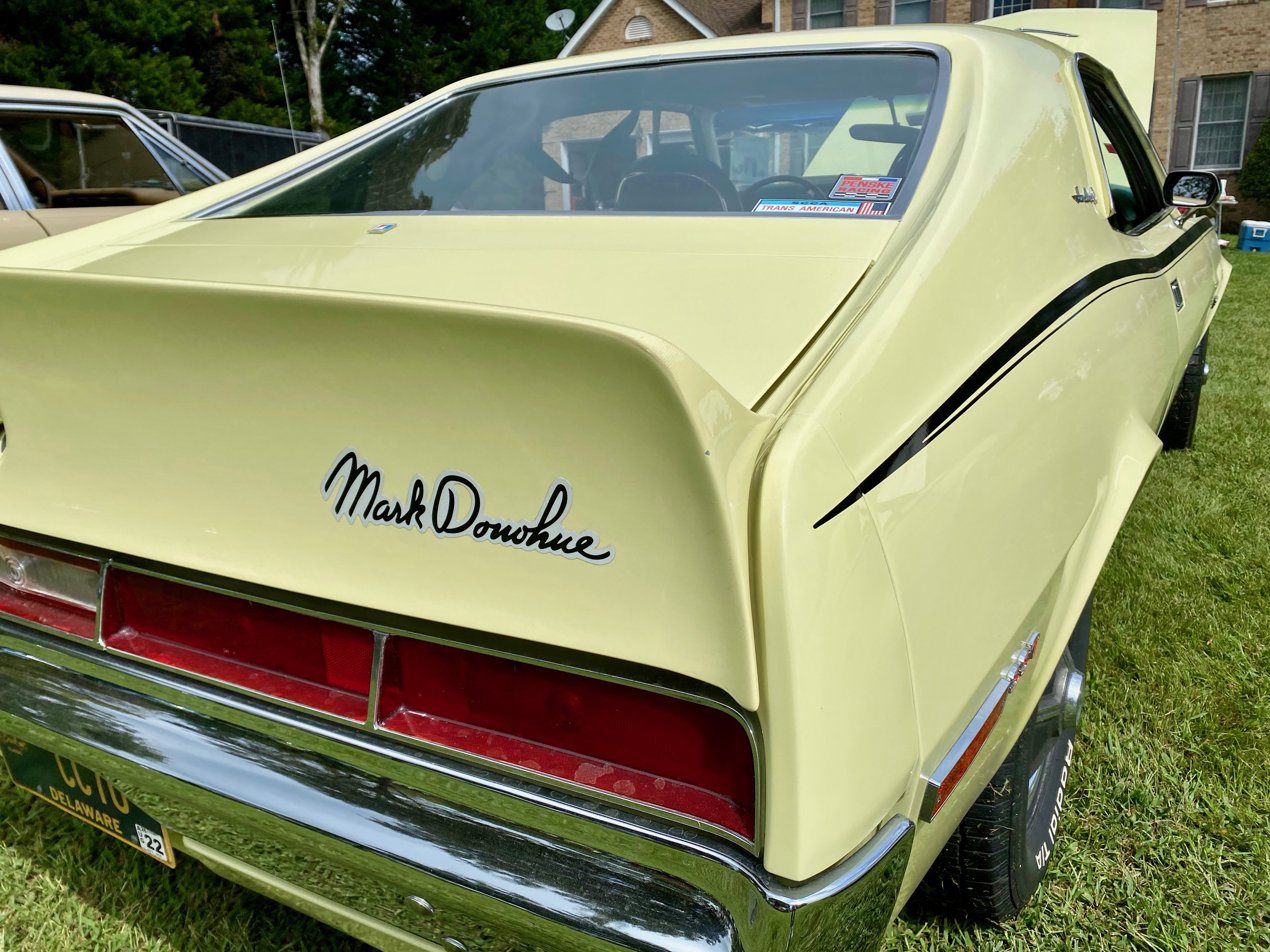
Rear spoiler with Mark Donohue's signature

The "Mark Donohue Javelin" was built to homologate the Donohue-designed rear ducktail spoiler. A total of 2,501 SST trim versions were made with the rear spoiler featuring his signature on the right side. Designed for Trans Am racing, the rules required factory production of 2,500 cars equipped with parts used for racing. The original plan was to have all Donohue Javelins built in SST trim with the unique spoiler, as well as the "Go Package" with Ram Air hood, a choice of a four-speed or automatic transmission on the floor, and a 360 cu in (5.9 L) engine with thicker webbing that allowed it to have four-bolt mains. Ultimately, the factory fitted the cars with the standard 360 or 390 engines. The Javelins could be ordered in any color (including "Big Bad" exteriors), upholstery, and any combination of extra-cost options.

American Motors did not include any specific identification (VIN code or door tag, other than the factory-printed window sticker and dealer documentation) to discern them. The "Mark Donohue Ducktail Spoiler" is itemized as a separate $58.30 option separately from the "Go Package" and other equipment on the Monroney sticker. Moreover, some Donohue Javalins cars came through with significant differences in equipment from the factory, while some dealers made their versions. This makes it easy to replicate and correspondingly difficult to authenticate a "real" Mark Donohue Javelin.

==== Trans-Am Javelin ====
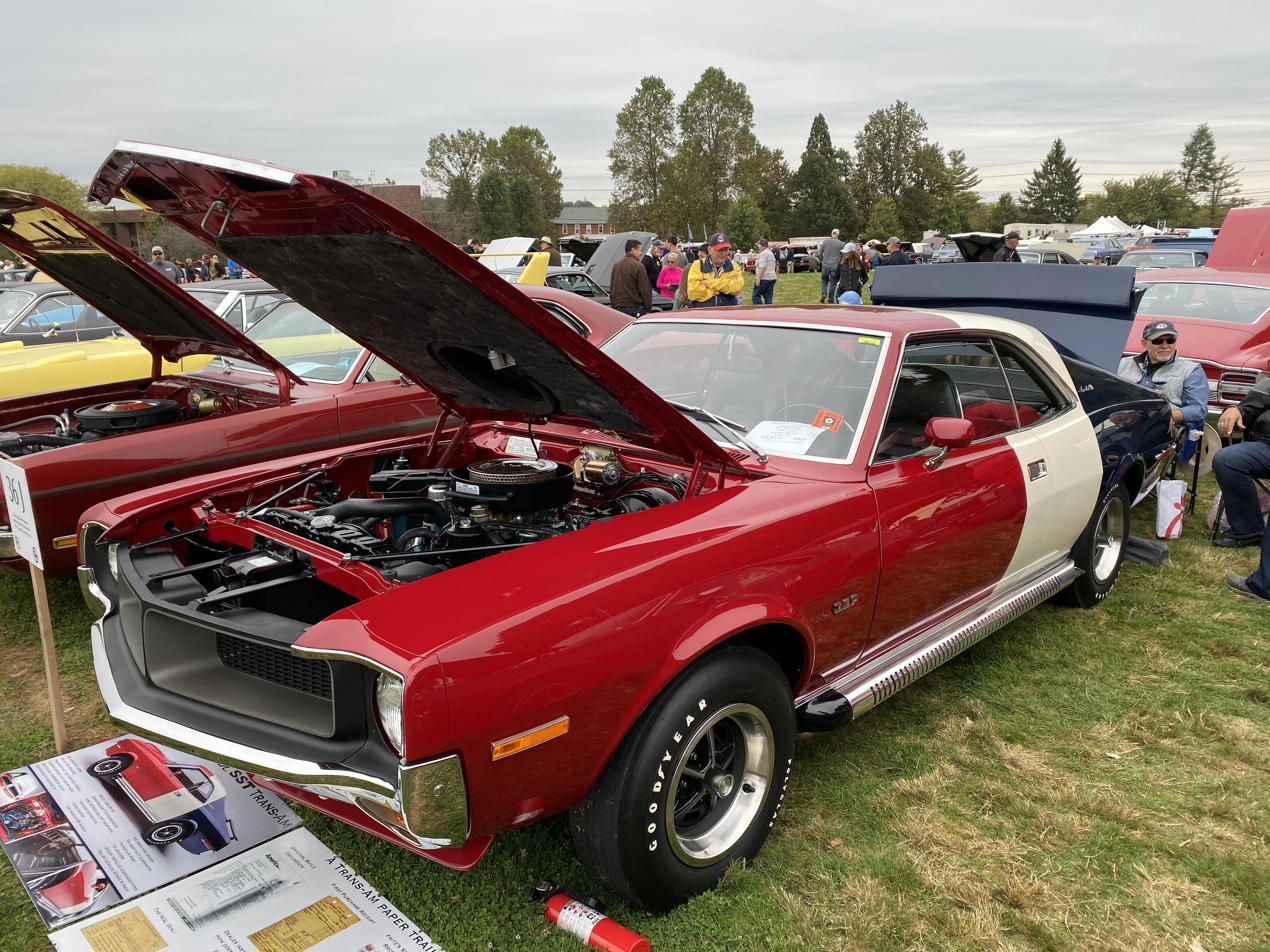
1970 Javelin Trans-Am in factory red/white/blue racing livery at AACA meet in Hershey, PA

American Motors celebrated the heroic achievements of its Trans Am series racing by making an estimated one hundred "Trans-Am" versions. These Javelins replicated the appearance of the race cars prepared by Ronnie Kaplan. They were not stripped racecar reversions, but designed for the street by including features such as such as comfortable seating and power-assisted steering and front disc brakes. All "Trans-Am" factory-built Javelins included the 390 cu in (6.4 L) V8 engine with heavy-duty and performance features along with the front and rear spoilers, and were also painted in AMC racing team's distinctive Matador Red, Frost White, and Commodore Blue "hash" paint livery.

The Trans Am Javelin had a significant advantage because of its 2,850 lb (1,293 kg) weight, versus the 3,060 lb (1,388 kg) Chevrolet Camaro and the Ford Mustang scaling up to 3,442 lb (1,561 kg). The Javelin was one of the lightest racing competitors, and "since everything was paired perfectly, a nimble performance car that could rule the streets, just like it did on the Trans Am racing circuit." Marketed to promote AMC's successes in SCCA racing, the Trans-Am Javelin's retail price was $3,995.

1970 AMC Javelin

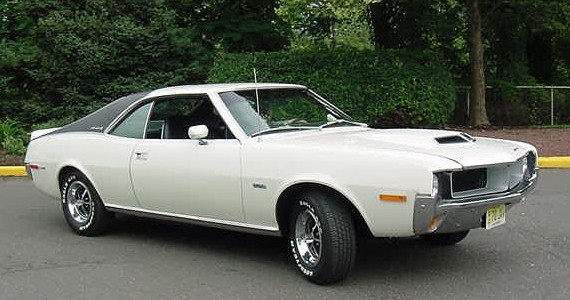
SST with "halo" vinyl-covered roof

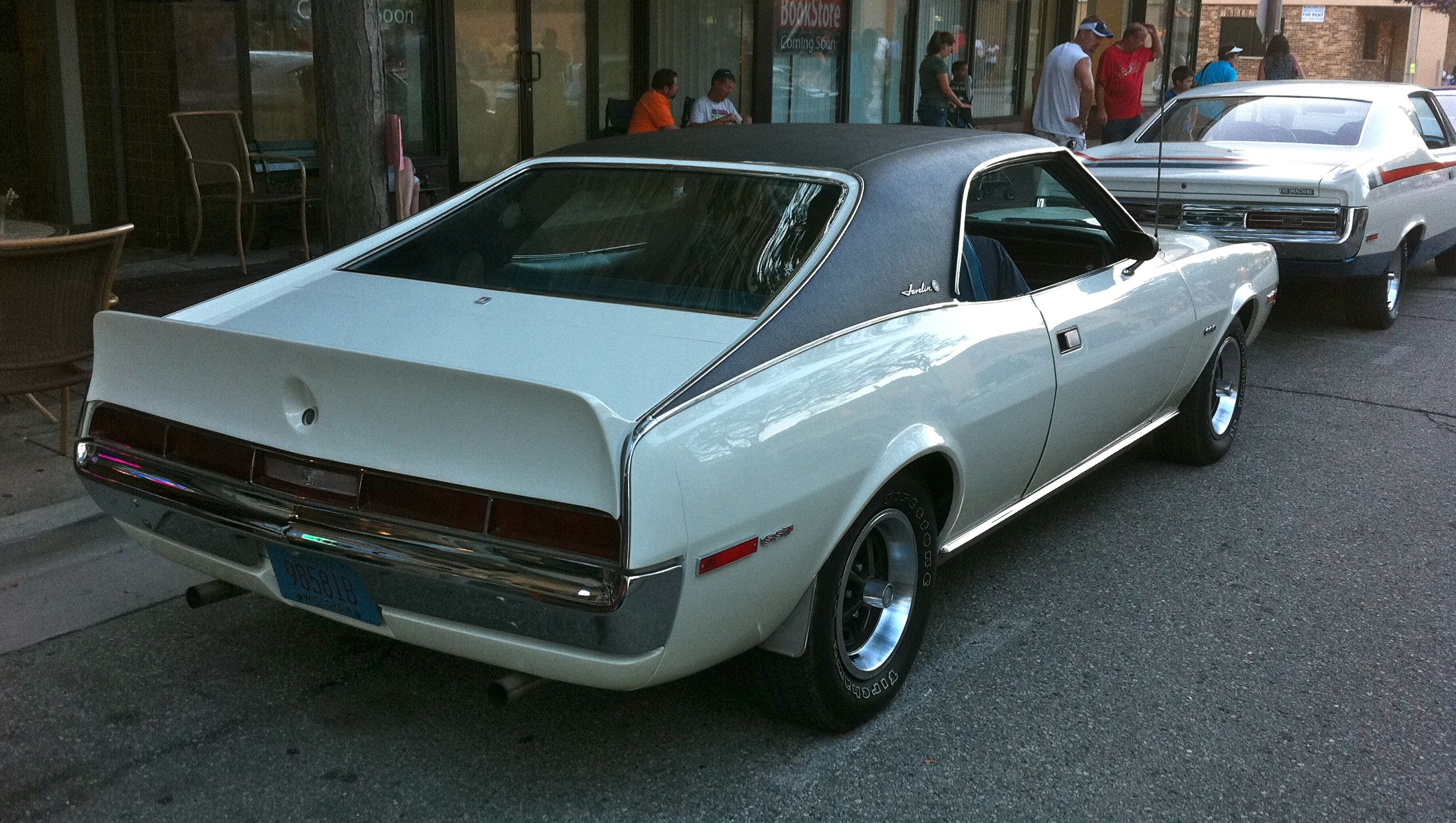
SST with full vinyl-covered roof

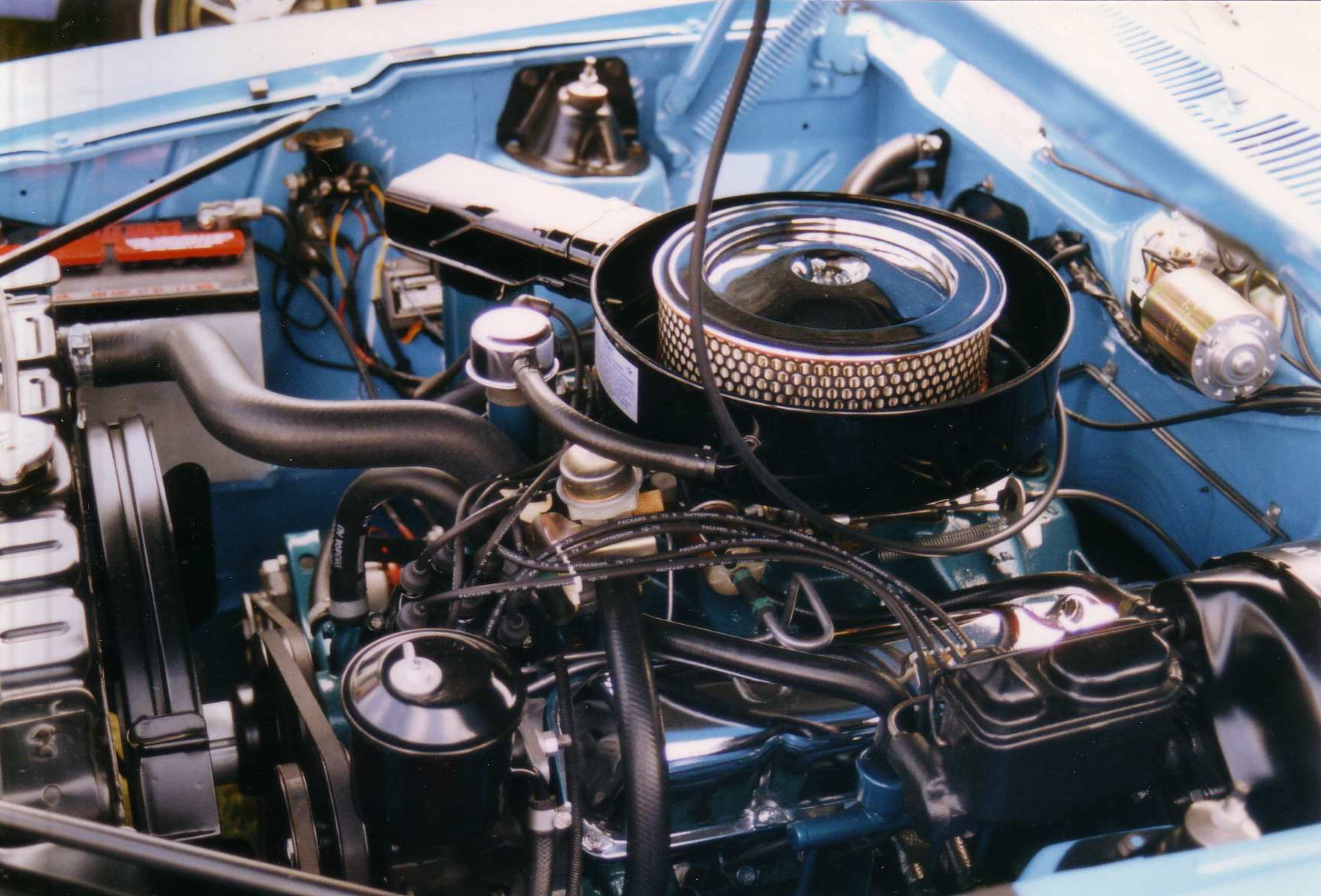
"Go Package" 390 engine

=== Racing ===
One of the biggest surprises of the 1970 motorsports season was the announcement that Penske Racing had taken over the AMC Javelin program, thus leaving the Camaro Trans-Am program to Jim Hall. American Motors hired Roger Penske and driver Mark Donohue to seriously campaign Javelins in SCCA Trans-Am Series. This coincided with the change in the Trans-Am rulebook allowing manufacturers to de-stroke pre-existing corporate engines, so AMC's 390 cu in (6.4 L) was used as the starting point to meet the 5 L (305 cu in) displacement rule that was still in place. The team included former Shelby chassis engineer Chuck Cantwell and a clockwork pit crew. The two-car Javelin effort provided the Bud Moore Ford Boss 302 Mustangs their "closest competition." AMC finished in second place in the Over 2-liter class of the 1970 series.

The strong participation by AMC in Trans-Am and drag racing served to enhance its image, and notable was that its motorsports efforts were achieved on a shoestring budget with the automaker racking up a respectable number of points against its giant competitors. For example, with an estimated 4.5 million participants and 6 million spectators, drag racing was the fastest-growing segment of motorsport in the U.S. The marketing strategy was to appeal to buyers who otherwise would not give AMC a second glance.

Motorsports

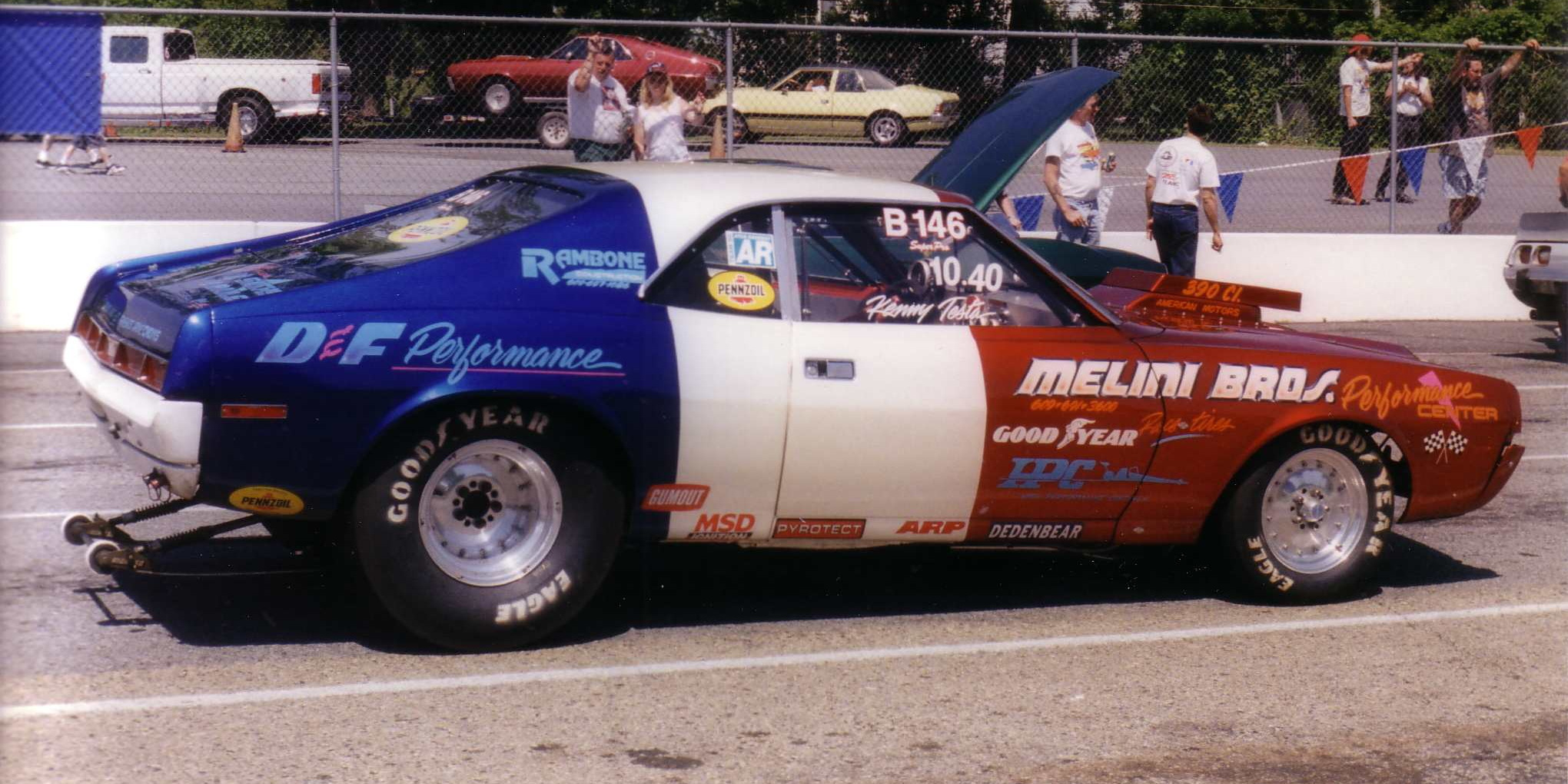
1970 AMC Javelin dragstrip car

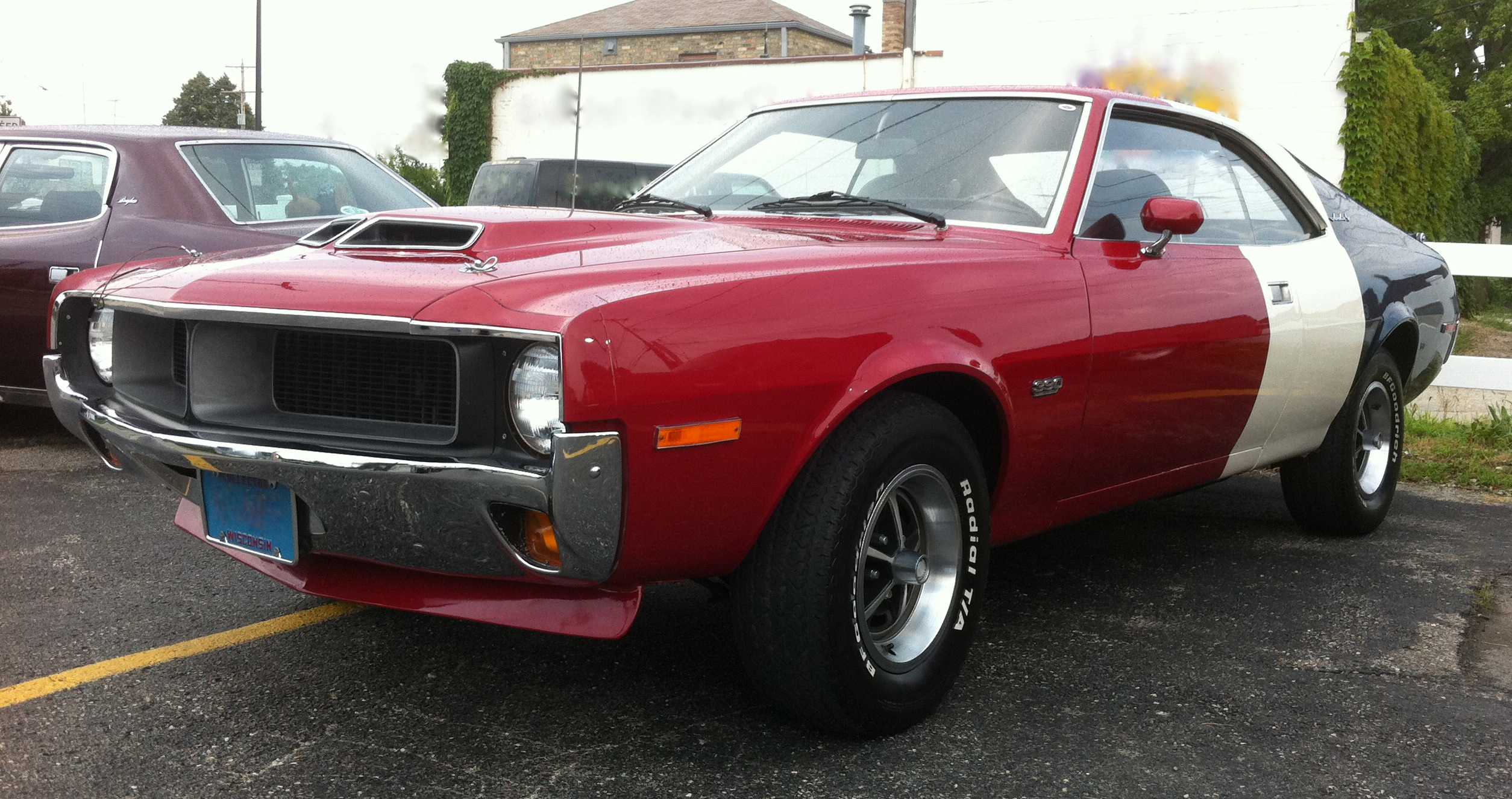
1970 Javelin Trans-Am in factory red/white/blue racing livery

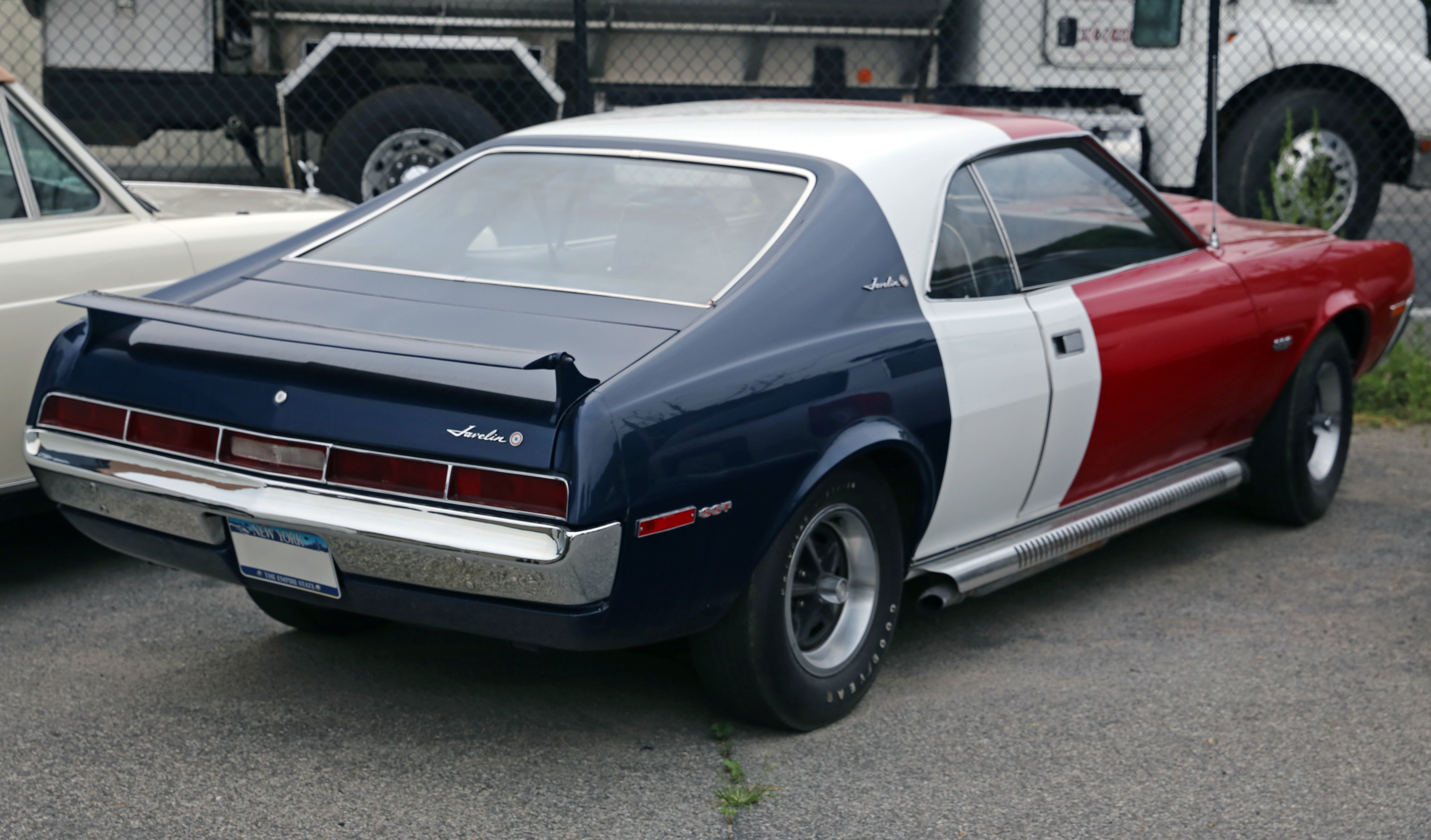
1970 Javelin Trans-Am with factory rear spoiler

== Second generation ==
1971–1974
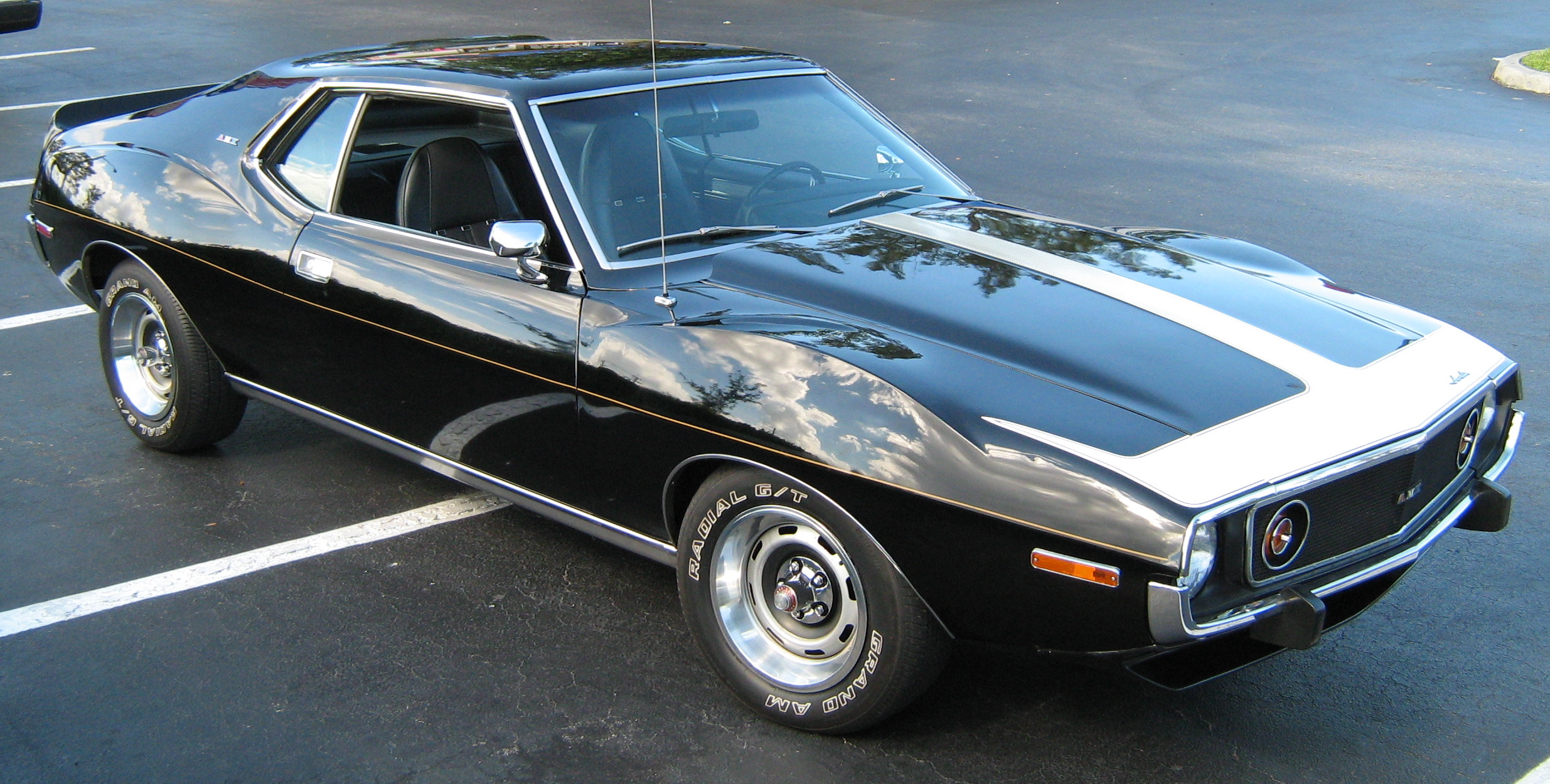
- 1974 AMC Javelin AMX with "Go Package"

Overview
- Also called: Rambler Javelin (Venezuela & Australia); VAM Javelin (Mexico)
- Production: August 1970 – 1974

Powertrain
- Engine: 232 cu in (3.8 L) I6 135 hp (101 kW) (1971), 100 hp (75 kW) (1972–74); 258 cu in (4.2 L) I6 150 hp (112 kW) (1971), 110 hp (82 kW) (1972–74); 282 cu in (4.6 L) I6 200 hp (149 kW; 203 PS) (Mexico only); 304 cu in (5.0 L) V8 2-bbl 210 hp (157 kW) (1971), 150 hp (112 kW) (1972–74); 360 cu in (5.9 L) V8 245 hp (183 kW) 2-bbl, 285 hp (213 kW; 289 PS) 4-bbl (1971), 175 hp (130 kW) 2-bbl (1972–74), 195 hp (145 kW; 198 PS) 4-bbl (1972–73), 220 hp (164 kW; 223 PS) 4-bbl (1974); 401 cu in (6.6 L) V8 330 hp (246 kW) (1971), 255 hp (190 kW) (1972–74)
- Transmission: 3-speed manual; 4-speed manual; 3-speed automatic; 3-speed "Torque-Command" on console

Dimensions
- Wheelbase: 110 in (2,794 mm)
- Length: 191.8 in (4,872 mm)
- Curb weight: 2,875 lb (1,304.1 kg) – 3,184 lb (1,444.2 kg)

The AMC Javelin was restyled for the 1971 model year. It followed the pony market segment trend to "bigger, beefier vehicles." The "1980-looking Javelin" design was purposely made to give the sporty car "individuality ... even at the risk of scaring some people off." Chuck Mashigan headed the redesign. The Javelin's long hood sloped downward at the front, the front fenders included raised blisters over the wheels, the rear fenders were flared, and the roof included "twin canopy" recesses, thus "endowing it with the appearance of an expensive European exotic."

The second generation looked much larger than the previous Javelins. Wheelbase was increased by 1-inch (25 mm) to 110 in (2,794 mm). However, height was dropped by 1.08 in (27 mm), and the most significant difference was in the 3.31 in (84 mm) width increase that was accompanied by a 3.31 in (84 mm) wider rear track, thus "improving both looks and handling."

The indicated engine power outputs also changed from those advertised through 1971, to more realistic calculations starting in 1972. The actual power output of the engine remained the same. Still, the U.S. automobile industry followed the SAE horsepower rating method that changed from "gross" in 1971 and prior years to "net" in 1972 and later years.

=== 1971 ===
The second generation AMC Javelin design incorporated an integral roof spoiler and sculpted fender bulges. The new body departed from the gentle, tucked-in look of the original.

The media noted the revised front fenders (originally designed to accommodate oversized racing tires) that "bulge up as well as out on this personal sporty car, borrowing lines from the much more expensive Corvette." The new design also featured an "intricate injection molded grille."

The car's dashboard was asymmetrical, with "functional instrument gauges that wrap around you with cockpit efficiency". The dashboard design continued to the driver's door panel. Toggle switches for the lights, wipers, and other controls were positioned in front of the driver while the radio was to the right, and the center section housed the climate controls and the ashtray.

The Javelins provided a choice of engines and transmissions that included a 232 cu in (3.8 L) I6 up to the 401 cu in (6.6 L) V8 with a single four-barrel carburetor and high compression ratio of 9.5:1 rated at 330 bhp (335 PS; 246 kW) at 5000 rpm and 430 lb⋅ft (583 N⋅m) at 3400 rpm of torque with a forged steel crankshaft and connecting rods engineered to withstand 8000 rpm. The BorgWarner T-10 four-speed manual transmission came with a Hurst floor shifter.

Three models were available: the base Javelin, SST, and AMX. Starting with the 1971 model year, the AMX was no longer a separate two-seater line. It evolved into a premium high-performance edition of the Javelin. The base version included vinyl upholstered bucket seats in four colors, full carpeting, molded door panels with integral armrests, and full-length body side pinstripes. The SST model included additional bright moldings and full-wheel covers. The interior featured upgraded upholstery, simulated burled walnut trim in the dashboard and door panels, a "rim-blow" sports steering wheel, and other enhancements. In addition to the standard 360 cu in (5.9 L) V8 engine, the AMX included engine-turned interior trim, sports console, dual outside rearview mirrors, rear spoiler, 14x6-inch spoke-style wheels with E70x14 fiberglass belted tires with raised white letters, a heavy-duty clutch, and a unique grille. The only tire upgrade for the AMX was E60x15 raised while letters with 15-inch "slot-style wheels.

The new Javelin-AMX incorporated several racing modifications, and AMC advertised it as "the closest thing you can buy to a Trans-Am champion". The car had a fiberglass full-width cowl induction hood, as well as spoilers front and rear for high-speed traction. Testing at the Ontario Motor Speedway by the Penske Racing Team recorded that the 1971 Javelin AMX's rear spoiler added 100 lb (45.4 kg) of downforce. Mark Donohue also advised AMC to make the AMX's grille flush for improved airflow. Thus, the performance model received a stainless steel mesh screen over the standard Javelin's deep openings.

The performance-upgrade "Go Package" provided the choice of a 360 or 401 4-barrel engine and included "Rally-Pac" instruments, a handling package for the suspension, "Twin-Grip" limited-slip differential, heavy-duty cooling, power-assisted disc brakes, white-letter E60x15 Goodyear Polyglas tires (on 15x7-inch styled slotted steel wheels) used on the Rebel Machine, a T-stripe hood decal, and a blacked-out rear taillight panel.

The 3,244-pound (1,471 kg) 1971 Javelin AMX with a 401 cu in (6.6 L) V8 ran the quarter-mile in the mid-14 second range at 93 miles per hour (150 km/h) on low-lead, low-octane gas.

1971 AMC Javelin

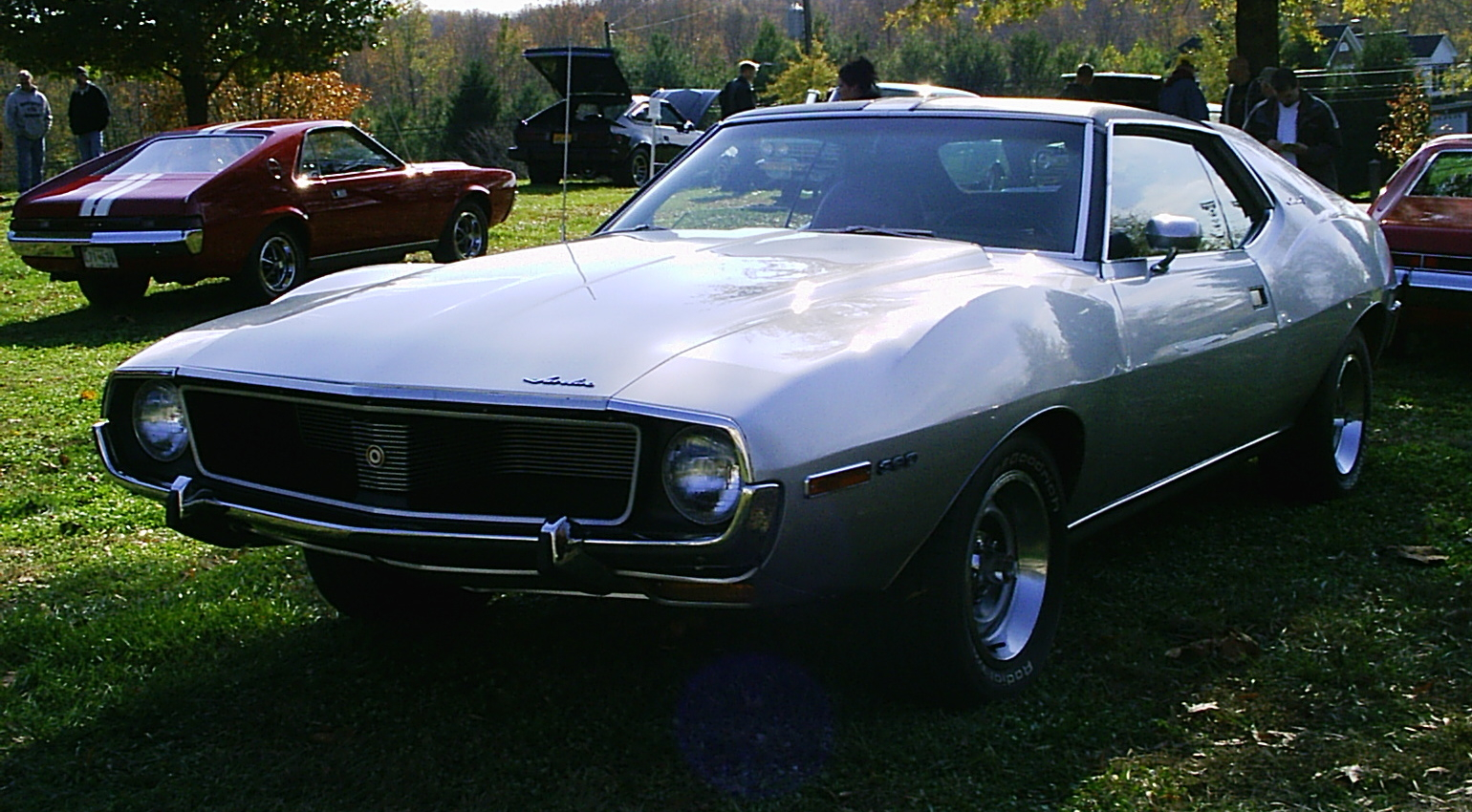
SST with "Twin Canopy" vinyl-covered roof

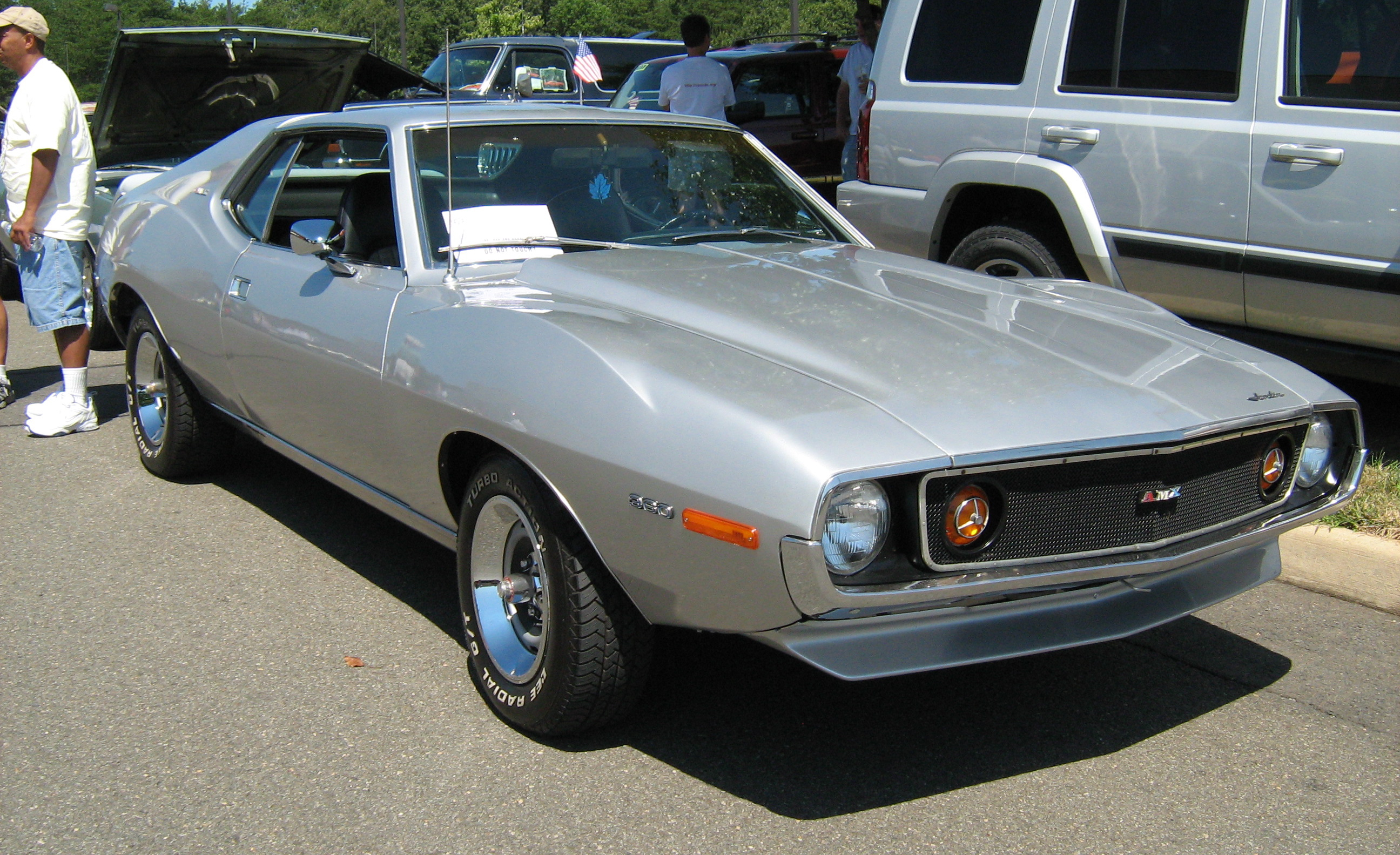
The AMX became the top performance model

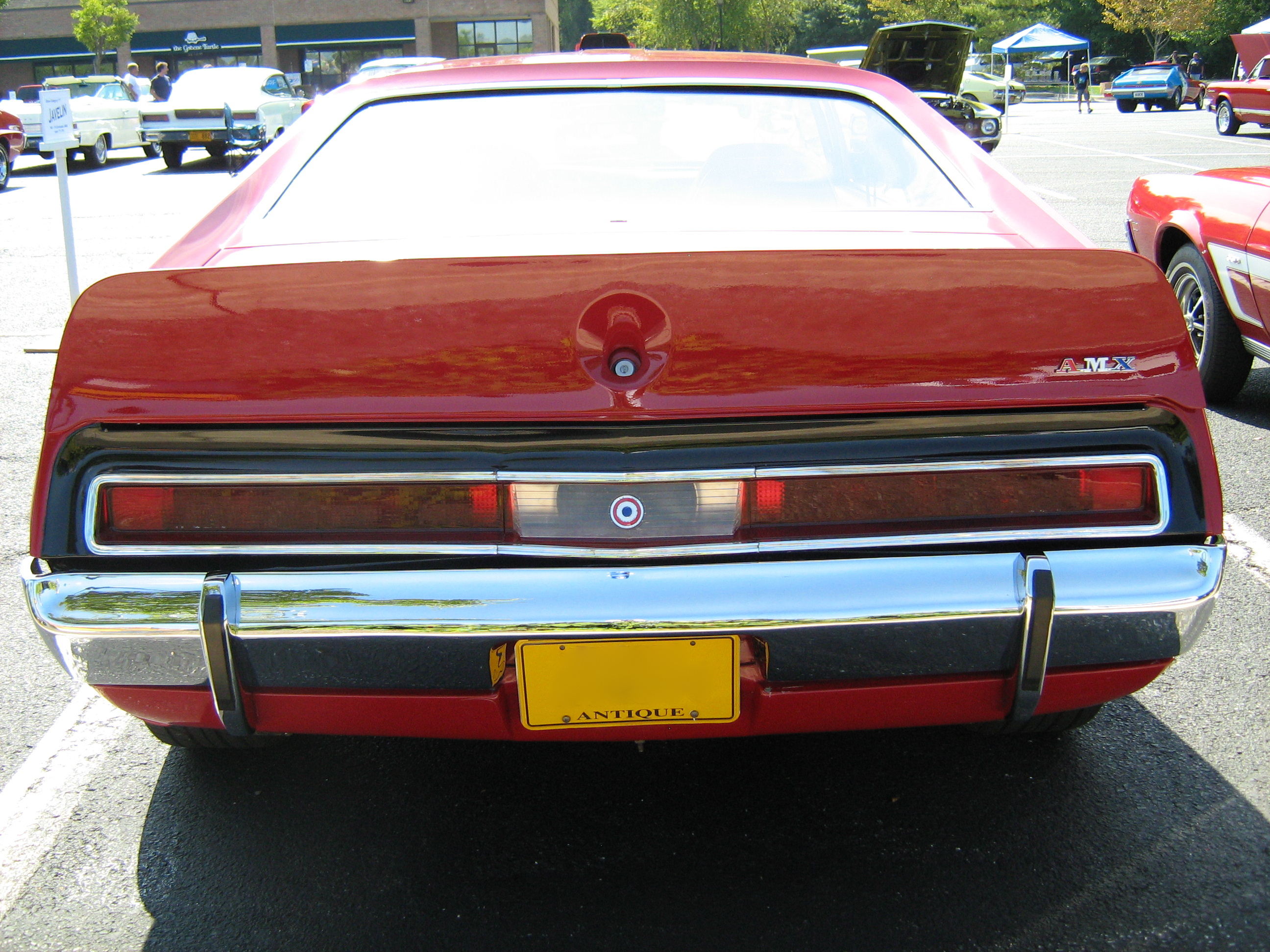
Standard duck-tail AMX spoiler

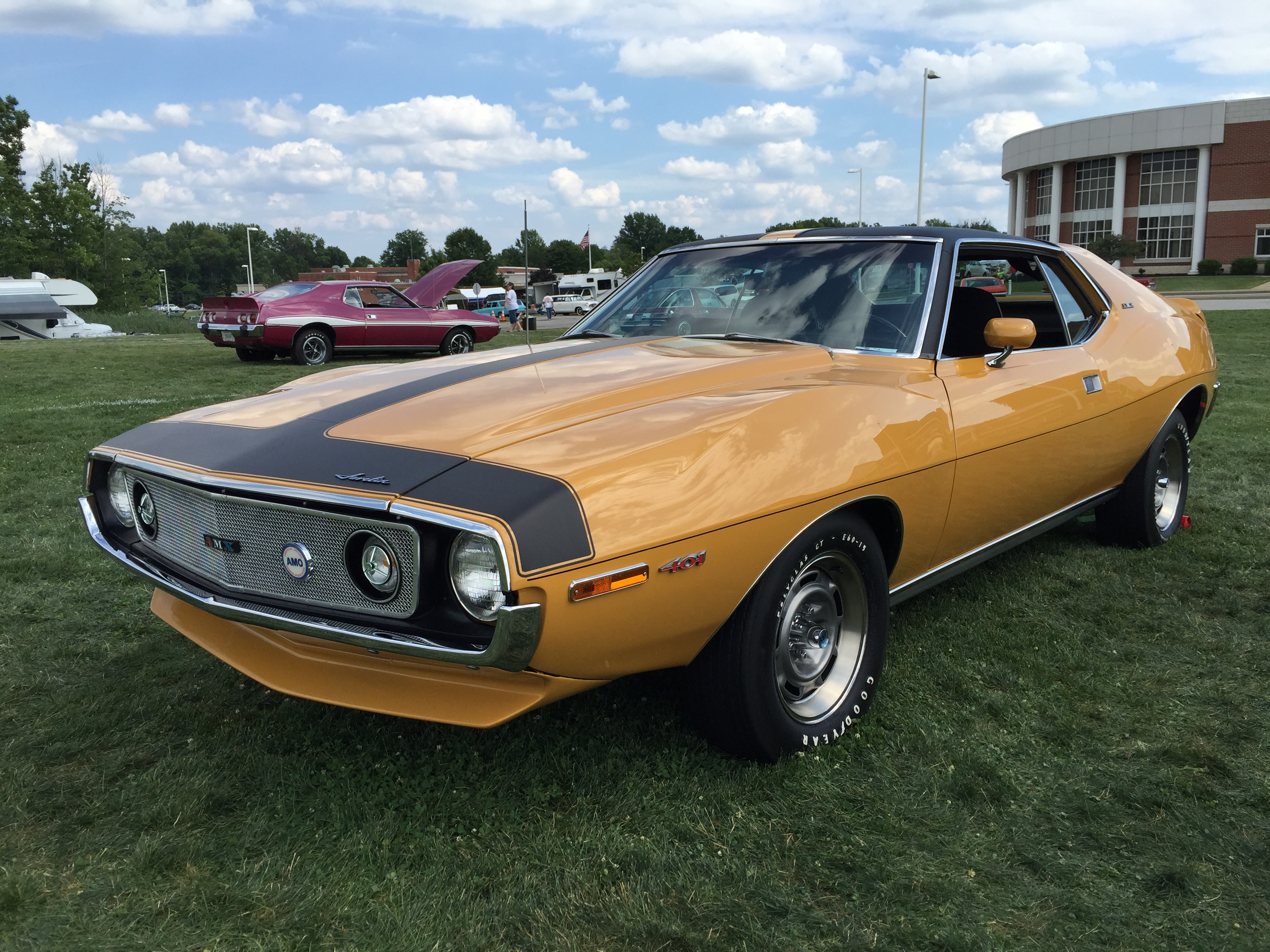
1971 AMC Javelin AMX 401 in Mustard Yellow at 2015 AMO show

=== 1972 ===
The 1972 model year AMC Javelins featured a new "egg crate" front grille design with a similar pattern repeated on the chrome overlay over the full-width taillights. The AMX version continued with the flush grille. A total of 15 exterior colors were offered with optional side stripes.

To consolidate the product offering, reduce production costs, and offer more value to consumers, the 1972 AMC Javelins were equipped with more standard comfort and convenience items. The base model was discontinued. Engine power ratings were downgraded to the more accurate Society of Automotive Engineers (SAE) net horsepower figures. Automatic transmissions were now the TorqueFlite units sourced from Chrysler, called "Torque-Command" by AMC.

American Motors achieved record sales in 1972 by focusing on quality and including an innovative warranty called the "Buyer Protection Plan" to back its products. This was the first time an automaker promised to repair anything wrong with the car (except for tires) for one year or 12,000 miles (19,000 km). Owners were provided with a toll-free telephone number to AMC, as well as a complimentary loaner car if a repair to their vehicle took more than a day.

By this time, the pony car market segment was declining in popularity. One commentator has said that "[d]espite the Javelin's "great lines and commendable road performance, it never quite matched the competition in the sales arena ... primarily because the small independent auto maker did not have the reputation and/or clout to compete with GM, Ford, and Chrysler".

1972 AMC Javelin

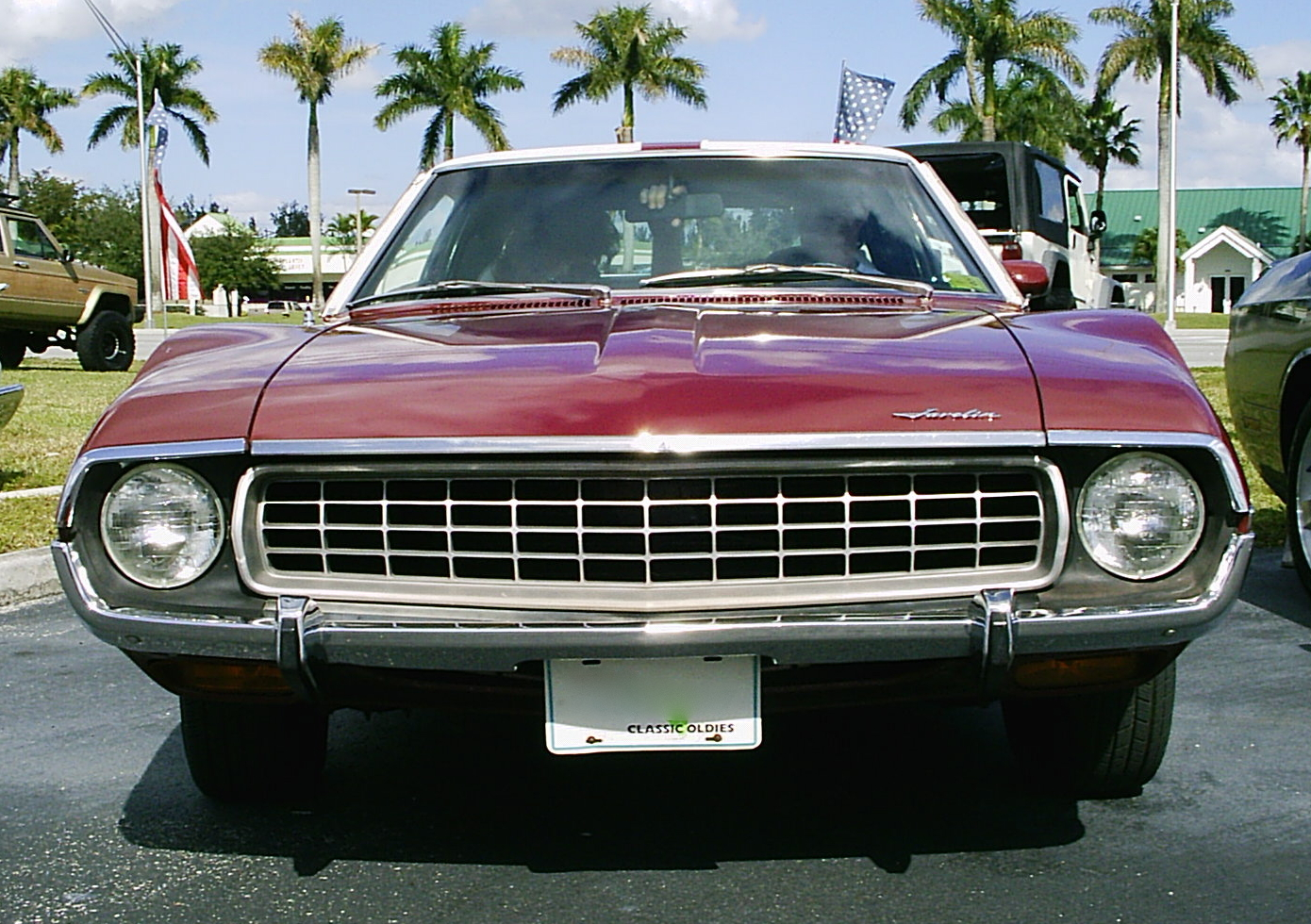
"Egg crate" grille on Javelin SST

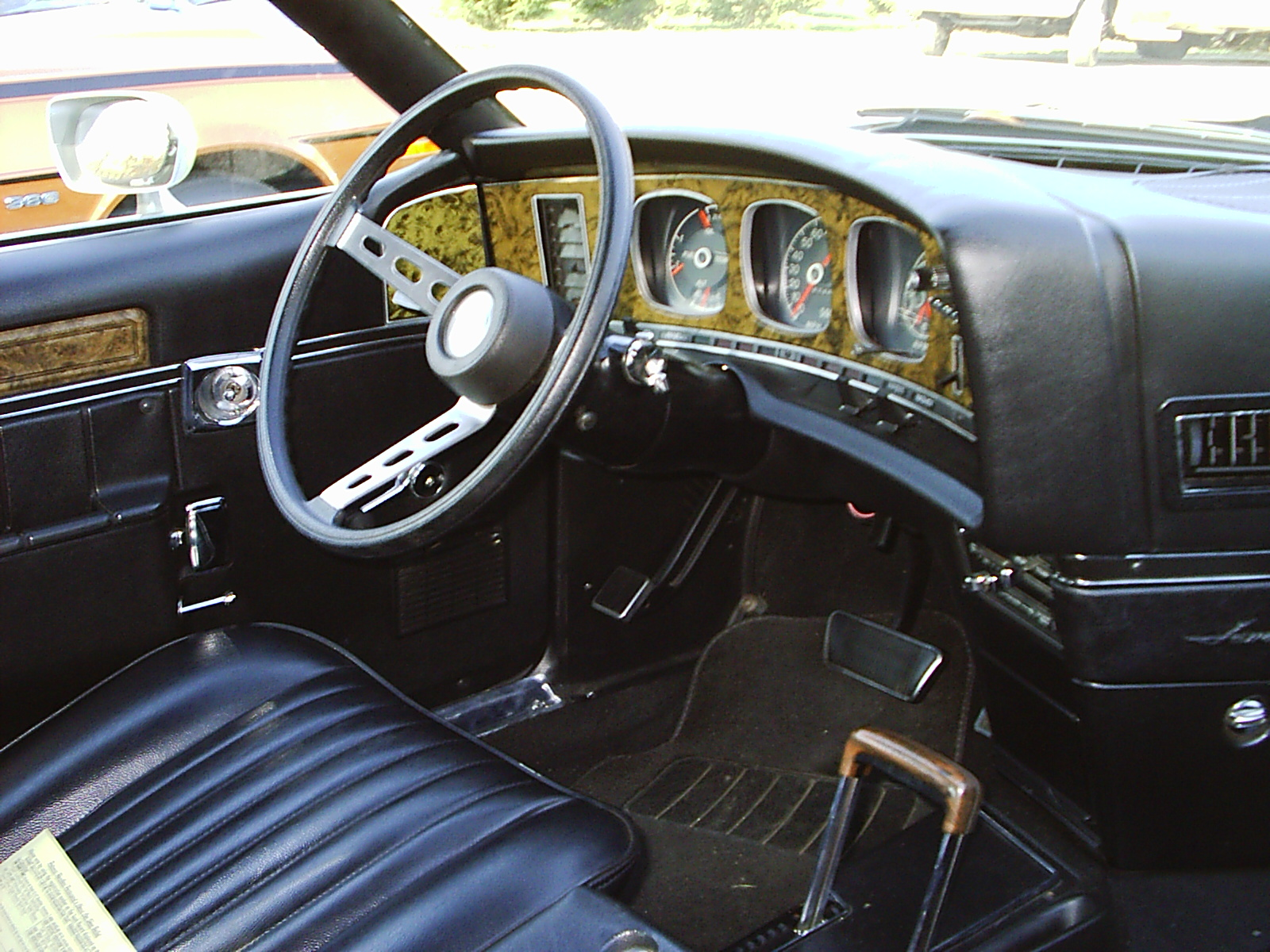
Driver-centered interior

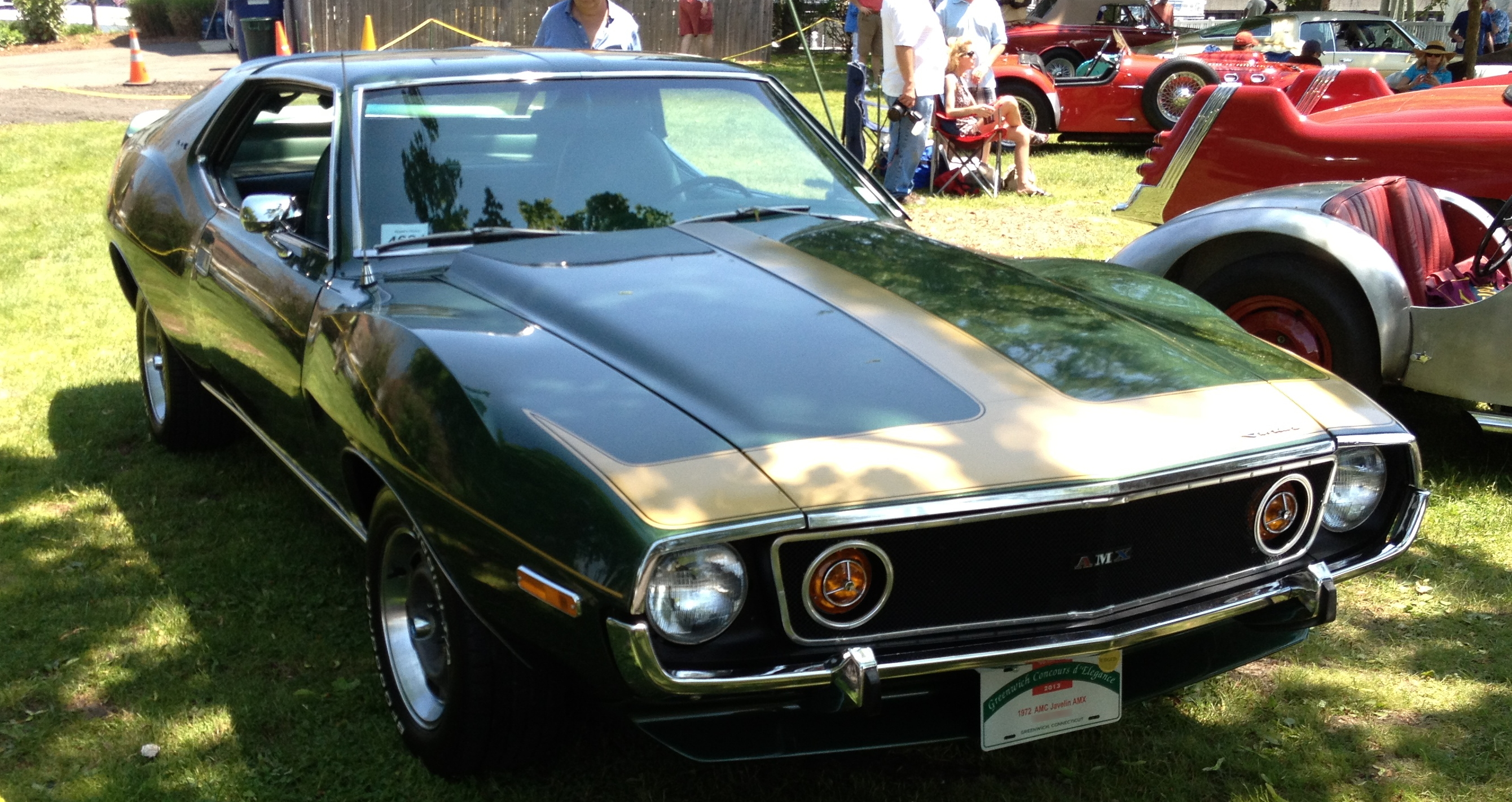
1972 AMC Javelin AMX

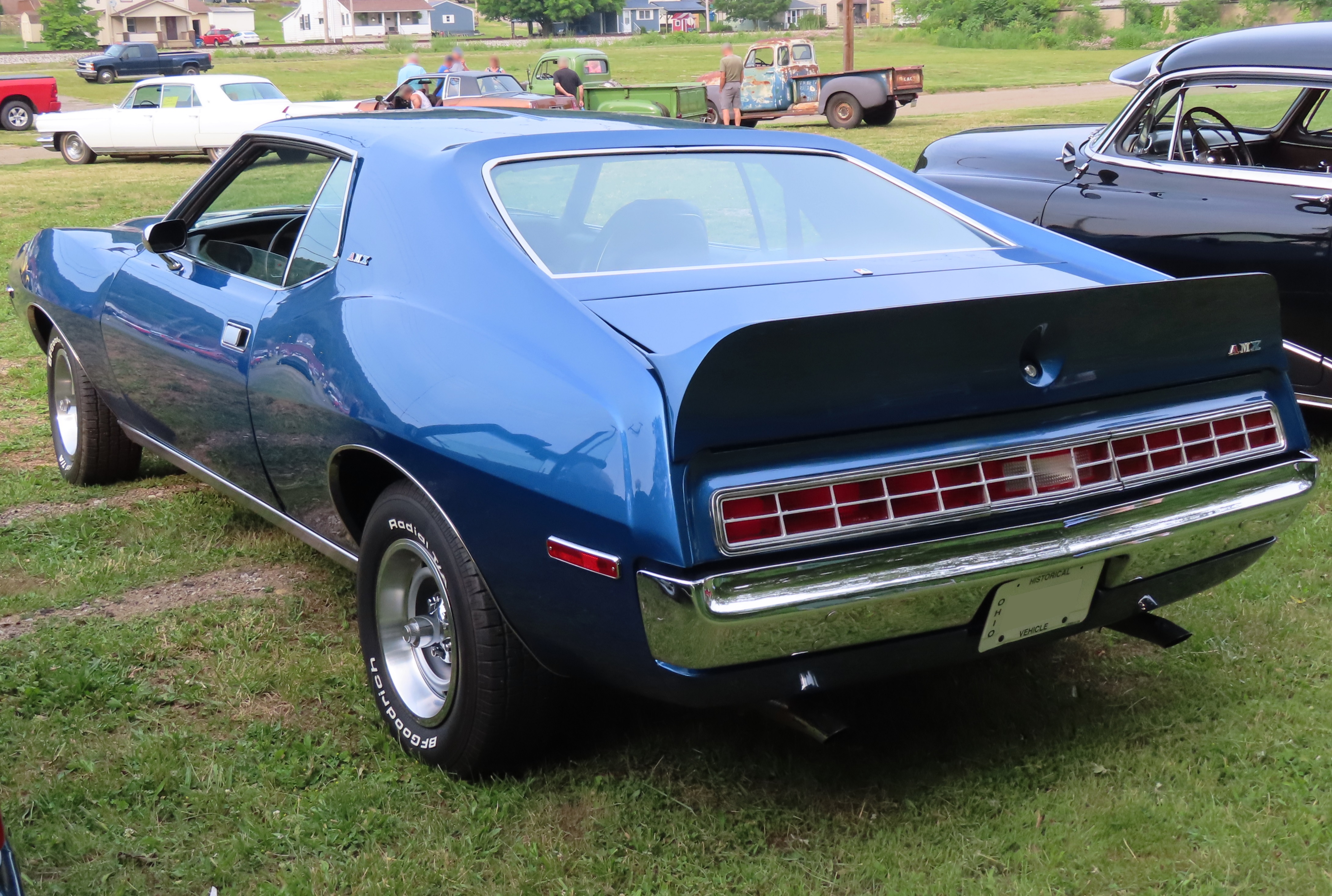
Taillamp design followed the grille

=== Pierre Cardin ===
During the 1972 and 1973 model years, a total of 4,152 Javelins were produced with optional interior design by fashion designer Pierre Cardin. The official on-sale date was 1 March 1972. The design features pleated red, plum, white, and silver stripes on a black background. Six multi-colored stripes in a nylon fabric with a stain-resistant silicone finish go from the front seats, up the doors, onto the headliner, and down to the rear seats. Chatham Mills produced the fabric for the seat faces. Cardin's crest appeared on the front fenders. MSRP of the option was $84.95. A 2007 magazine article described the design as the "most daring and outlandish" of its kind.

Pierre Cardin Javelin

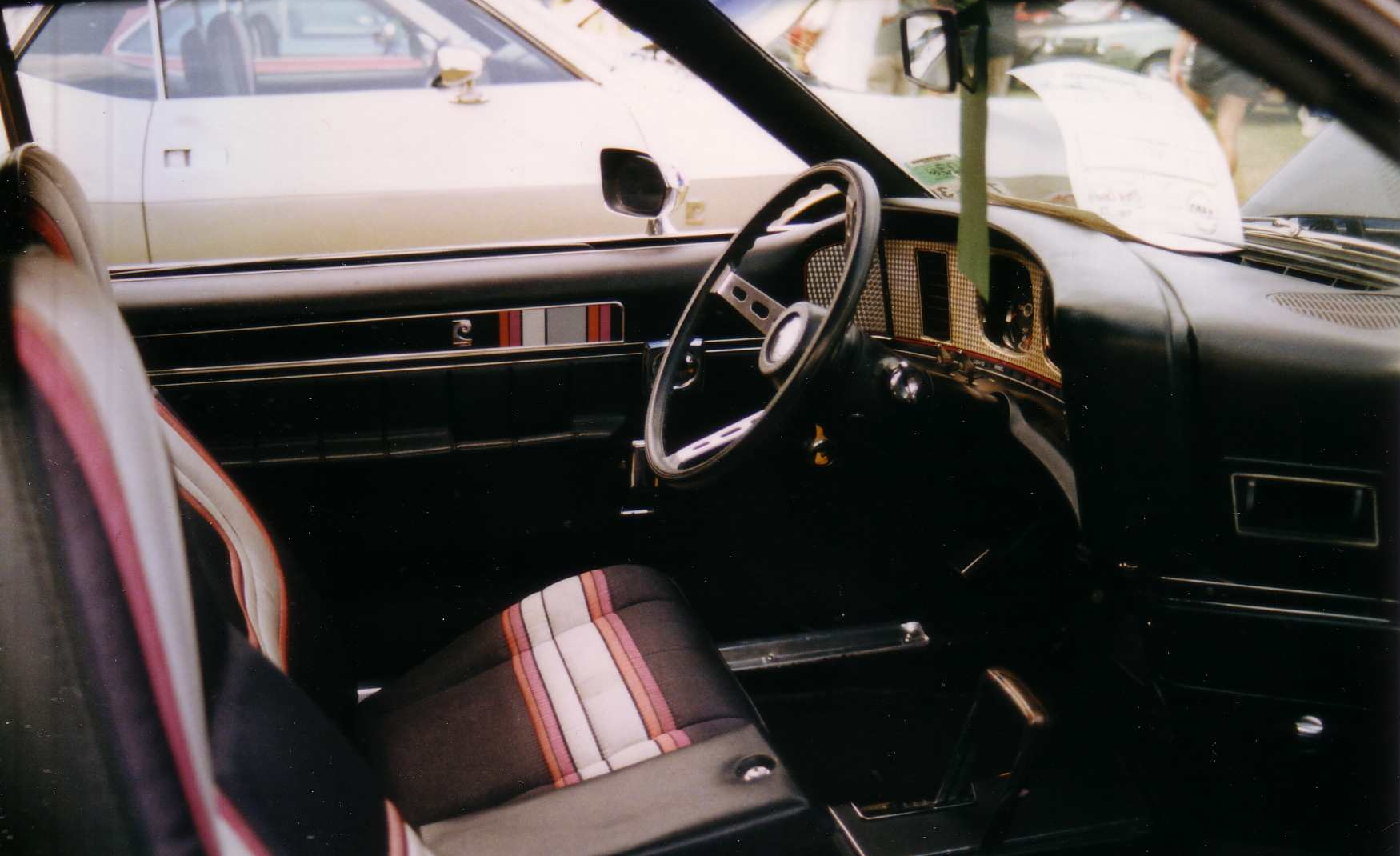
1972 Cardin interior

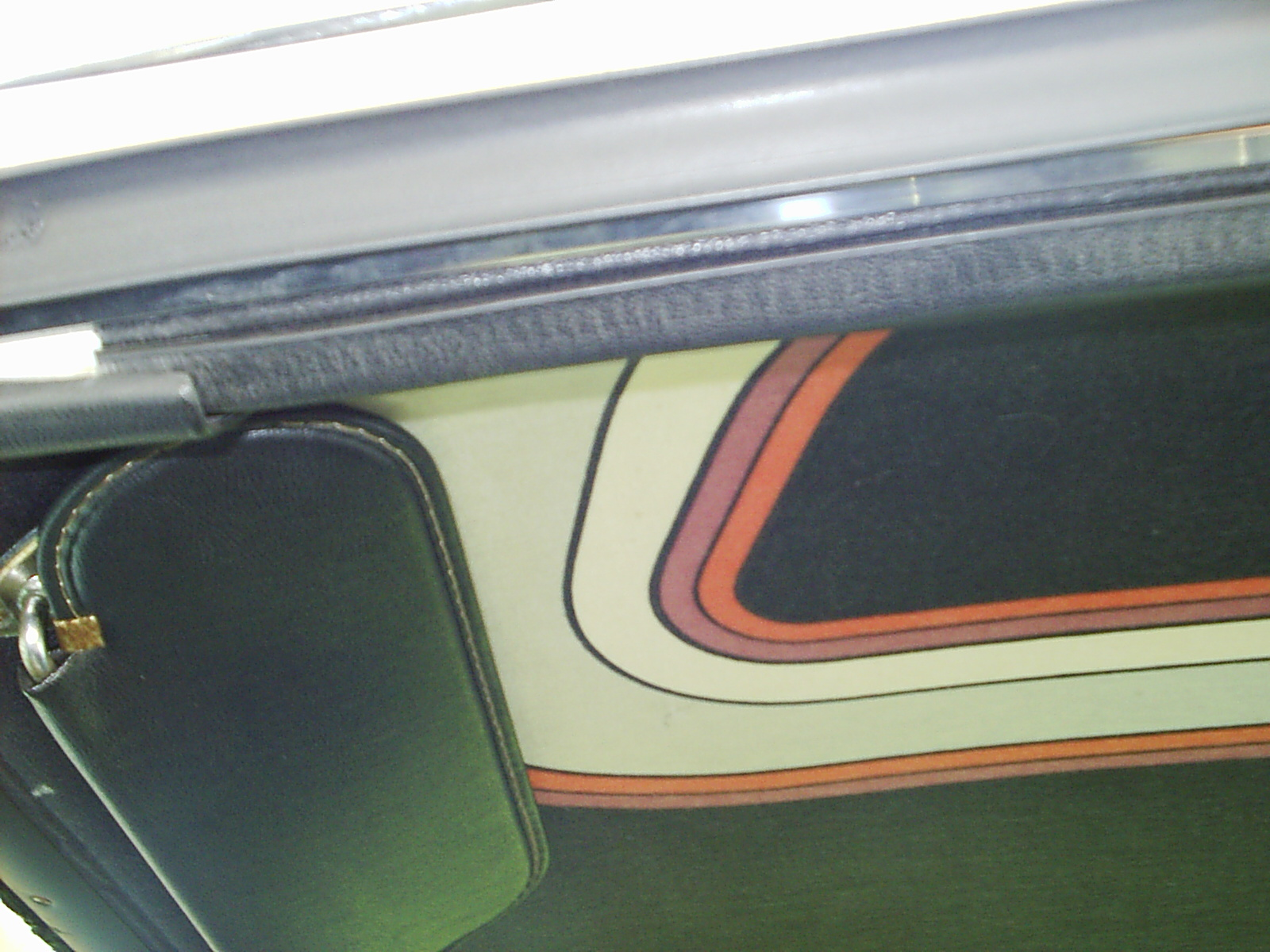
Headliner with Cardin stripes

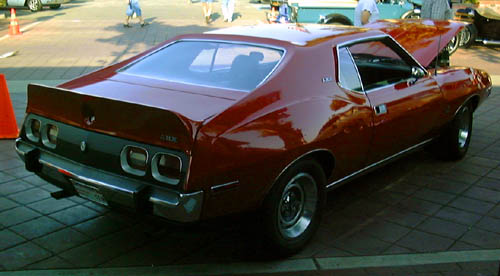
1973 Cardin version

=== 1973 ===
The 1973 model year Javelins incorporated several updates, most noticeably in the design of the taillights and grille, although the AMX grille remained the same. While all other AMC models had bumpers with telescopic shock absorbers, the Javelin and AMX were fitted with a non-telescopic design that had two rigid rubber guards. These allowed the cars to withstand a 5-mile-per-hour (8 km/h) front and 2.5-mile-per-hour (4 km/h) rear impacts without damage to the engine, lights, and safety equipment. The doors were also made stronger to comply with new U.S. National Highway Traffic Safety Administration (NHTSA) safety standards that they withstand 2,500 pounds (1,134 kg) of impact for the first 6 inches (152 mm) of crush. The "twin-cove" indentations were eliminated from the Javelin's roof and a full vinyl top was made available. The 1970–1972 "Turtle Back" front seats were replaced by a slimmer, lighter, and more comfortable design that provided more legroom for rear-seat passengers. The SST model was dropped, and the car was now called Javelin.

All engines incorporated new emissions controls. The 1973 401 cu in (6.6 L) V8 was rated at net 255 hp (190 kW; 259 PS) and achieved 0 to 60 mph acceleration in 7.7 seconds with a top speed of 115.53 mph (185.93 km/h), despite the Javelin's four-place size and weight. Performance figures conducted by Road Test magazine of a 1973 Javelin SST with the 401 cu in (6.6 L) 4-barrel V8 engine and four-speed manual transmission resulted in "respectable" quarter-mile (402 m) dragstrip runs of 15.5 seconds at 91 mph (146 km/h).

American Motors continued its comprehensive "Buyer Protection" extended warranty on all 1973 models that now covered food and lodging expenses of up to $150 should a car require overnight repairs when the owner is more than 100 miles (161 km) away from home. The automaker promoted improved product quality with an advertising campaign that emphasized, "We back them better because we build them better". Profits for the year achieved a record high.

Javelin production for the 1973 model year totaled 30,902 units, including 5,707 AMX units.

=== Trans Am Victory edition ===
Javelins driven in the Trans-Am captured the racing title for American Motors in both the 1971 and 1972 seasons. The back-to-back SCCA championships with specially prepared race cars were celebrated by AMC by offering a limited run of "Trans Am Victory" edition 1973 Javelins. The package was available on cars built from October to 15 December 1972, on any Javelin SST, except with the Cardin interior. A single magazine advertisement, featuring the winning race drivers George Follmer and Roy Woods, promoted the special package.

These cars came packaged with an additional cost optional visibility group, light group, insulation group, protection group, and sports-style steering wheel, but also received at no additional cost (but valued at $167.45) three other features—large "Javelin Winner Trans Am Championship 1971–1972 SCCA" fender decals on the lower portion behind the front wheel openings, 8-slot rally styled steel wheels with E70x14 Polyglass raised white letter tires and a "Space-Saver" spare tire. The Trans Am Victory cars were also typically pre-built, even more "heavily optioned than regular production Javelins." American Motors designed a quick identification system of its models by an information-rich Vehicle Identification Number (VIN) system. However, because this was only a limited promotional "value added" marketing campaign, except as noted on the original window sticker, there is no VIN or door tag code to distinguish an authentic Trans Am-Victory edition car.

1973 AMC Javelin

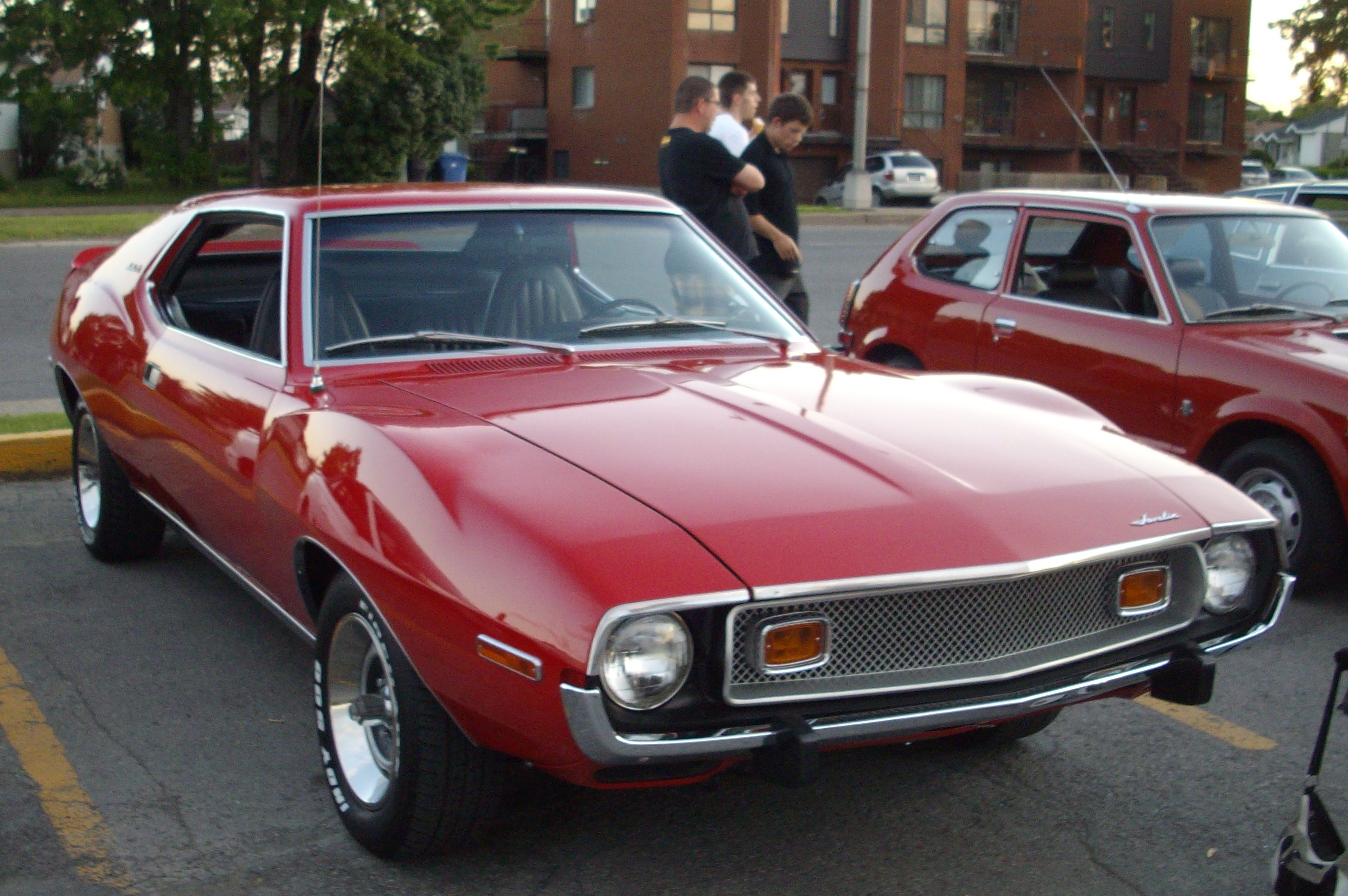
Redesigned grille of the Javelin

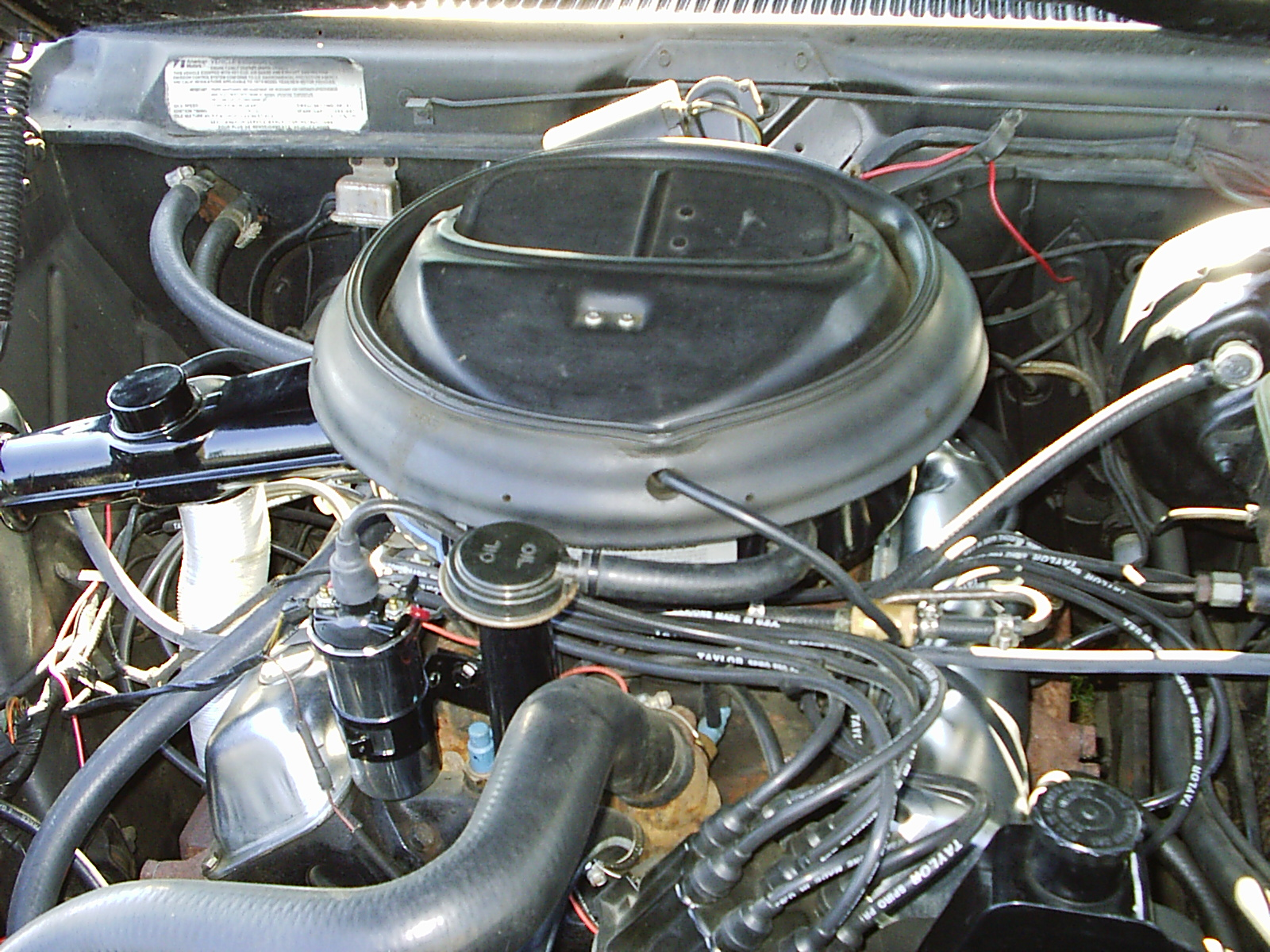
401 CID V8 with ram air

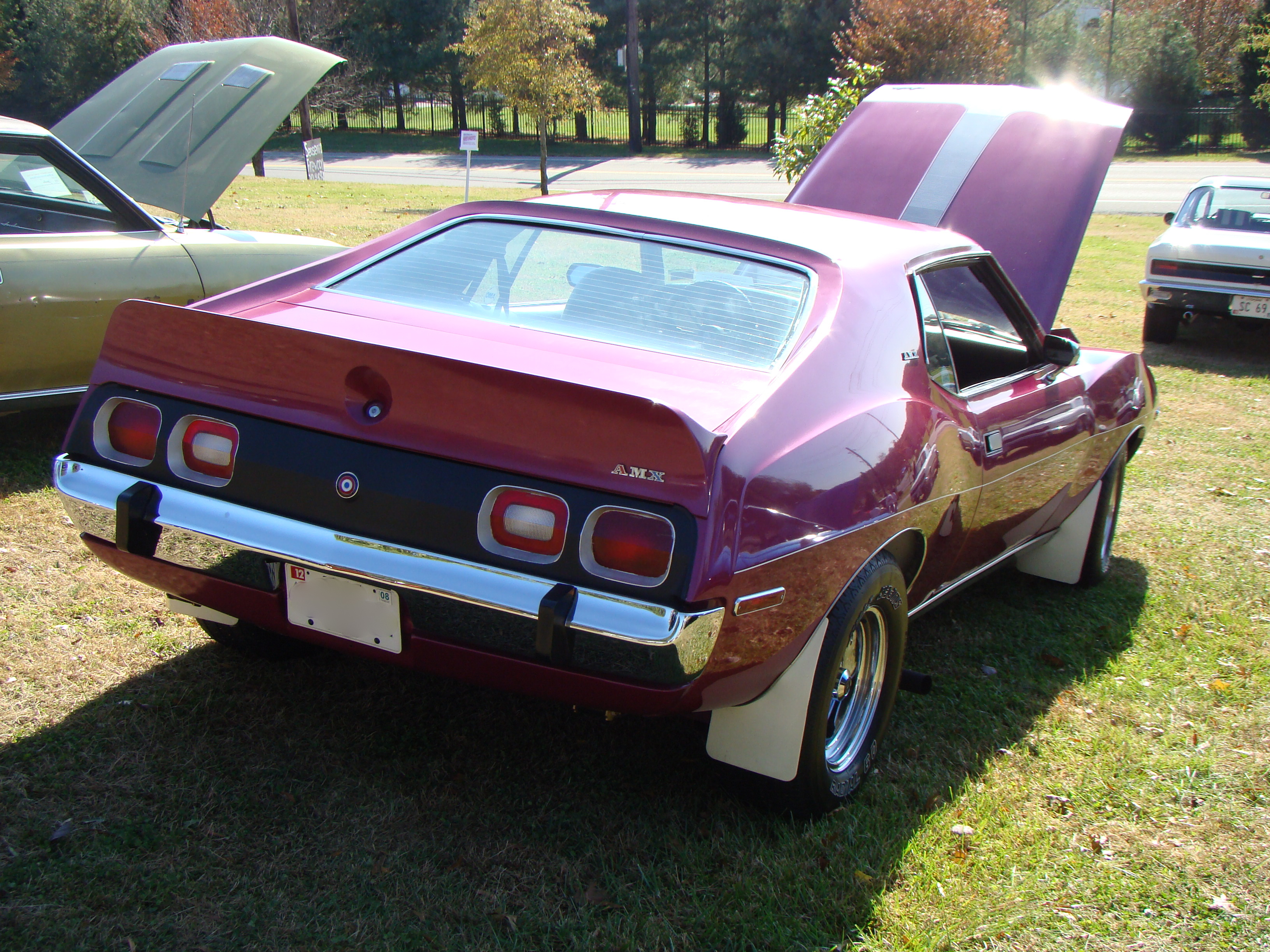
Javelin AMX rear end

=== 1974 ===
The 1974 model year AMC Javelins included upgraded front and rear bumpers with standard bumper guards. An optional enlarged bumper guard system was required in California, Georgia, Maryland, and North Carolina. Front disc brakes became standard equipment while radial tires became optional. The AMX versions included F70x14 raised white letter tires with optional E60x15 white letter tires with 15-inch slot style wheels optional. The functional cowl-induction fiberglass hood that was previously part of the 'Go Package' of performance options was no longer available for 1974, tho its non-functional twin remained the standard hood on Javelin-AMX versions. Some very-late-production Javelin-AMXs came with the base, flat steel hoods when inventory of the cowled hoods ran out.

Engines featured induction-hardened exhaust valve seats, and all could use regular, low-lead, or no-lead gasoline. The output of the 401 cu in (6.6 L) V8 dropped by 20 hp (15 kW; 20 PS). The 232 cu in (3.8 L) I6 with three-speed manual transmission on the floor was the base combination in the Javelin, with 258 cu in (4.2 L) and automatic shifter on the column optional. The 304 cu in (5.0 L) V8 became standard for the AMX model with optional two- or four-barrel 360 cu in (5.9 L). The four-barrel versions of the 360 cu in (5.9 L) and 401 cu in (6.6 L) engines were available with floor or console-mounted four-speed manual transmissions. Javelins with the 304 cu in (5.0 L) were rated at 150 hp (112 kW; 152 PS) with 245 lb⋅ft (332 N⋅m) of torque and capable of quarter mile ET of 17.5 seconds, which was competitive in 1974.

Front bucket seats received additional foam padding to improve comfort. A new three-point lap-and-shoulder belt design with an interlock system prevented the car from starting if the driver and a front passenger were unbuckled. Lawmakers repealed this safety feature due to public opposition.

By 1974, the automobile marketplace had changed. Mid-year, Chrysler abandoned the pony car market. Whereas Ford replaced its original Mustang with a smaller four-cylinder version, and other pony car manufacturers also downsized engines, the Javelin's big engine option continued until the production of the model ended in October/November 1974, amidst the Arab oil embargo and overall declining interest in high-performance vehicles.

The 1974 AMX did not do as well in the marketplace compared to the new Camaro, Firebird, and the downsized Mustang II – all of which saw increased sales. Javelin production, meanwhile, reached a second-generation high of 22,556 Javelins, and an additional 4,980 Javelin AMX models were produced for the final model year. The demand for Javelins was higher than the combined total for Chrysler's pony cars in 1974 (11,354 Dodge Challengers and 11,734 Plymouth Barracudas).

Several factors led to the demise of the Javelin model, not least the economic climate of the time. The price for gasoline following the 1973 oil crisis, the Emergency Highway Conservation Act mandating a national 55 mph (89 km/h) speed limit, and rising automobile insurance premiums were also signals for consumers who were turning away from traditional pony cars.

While the 1974 model was exempt from stricter 1974 bumper standards, AMC estimated it would take $12 million in engineering and design work to revise the bumpers to meet the 1975 standards.

American Motors also introduced the all-new 1974 Matador coupe, described by Popular Mechanics as "smooth and slippery and actually competes with the Javelin for "boss" muscle-car styling". The automaker was also preparing to launch its all-new AMC Pacer. According to John A. Conde, AMC needed the manufacturing line to assemble the Pacers, "so we decided to drop the Javelin."

Nevertheless, more cars were built during the final year of Javelin production than in the prior second-generation years, with 27,696 units built, of which about 15 percent were the Javelin AMX versions.

1974 AMC Javelin

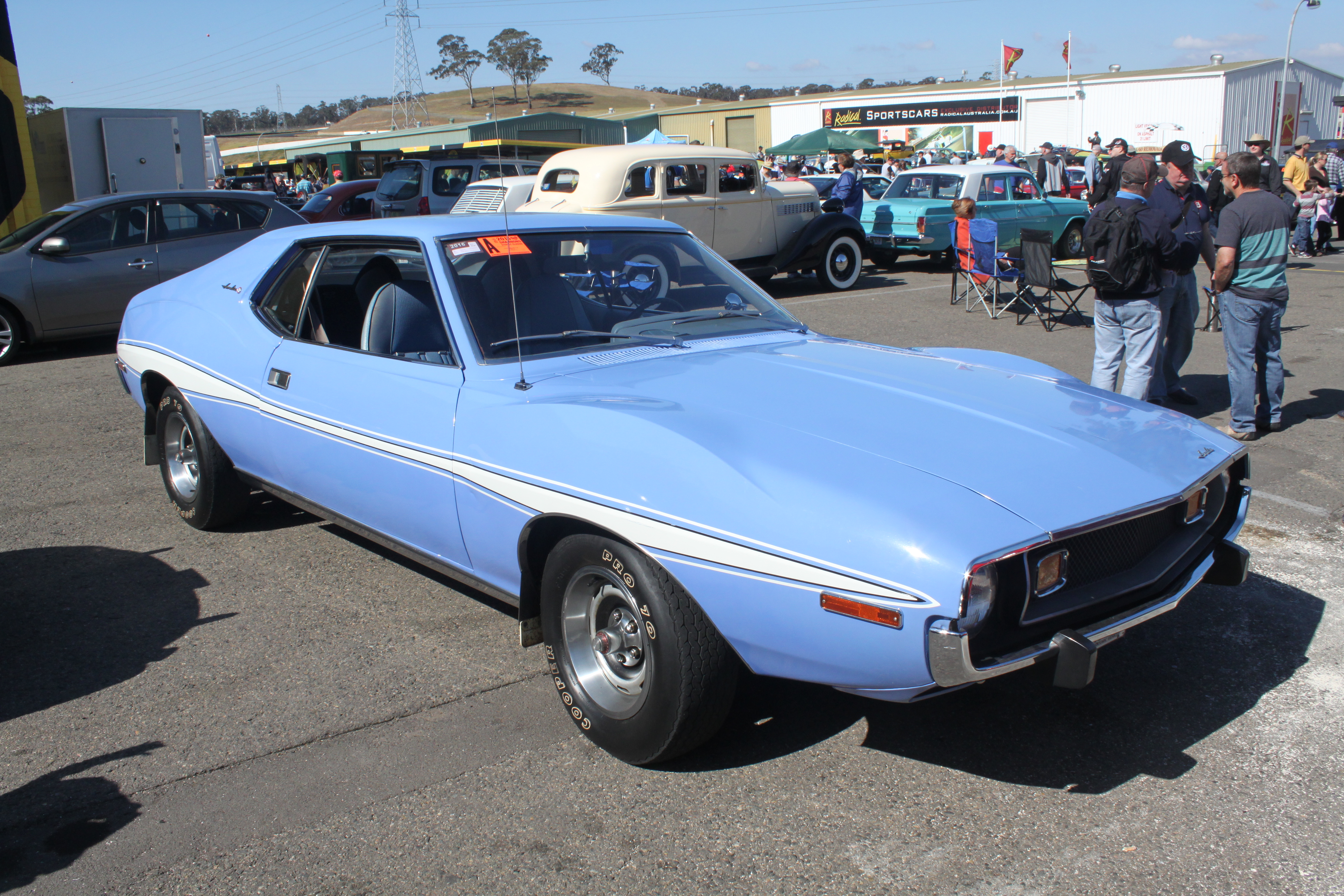
1974 AMC Javelin front

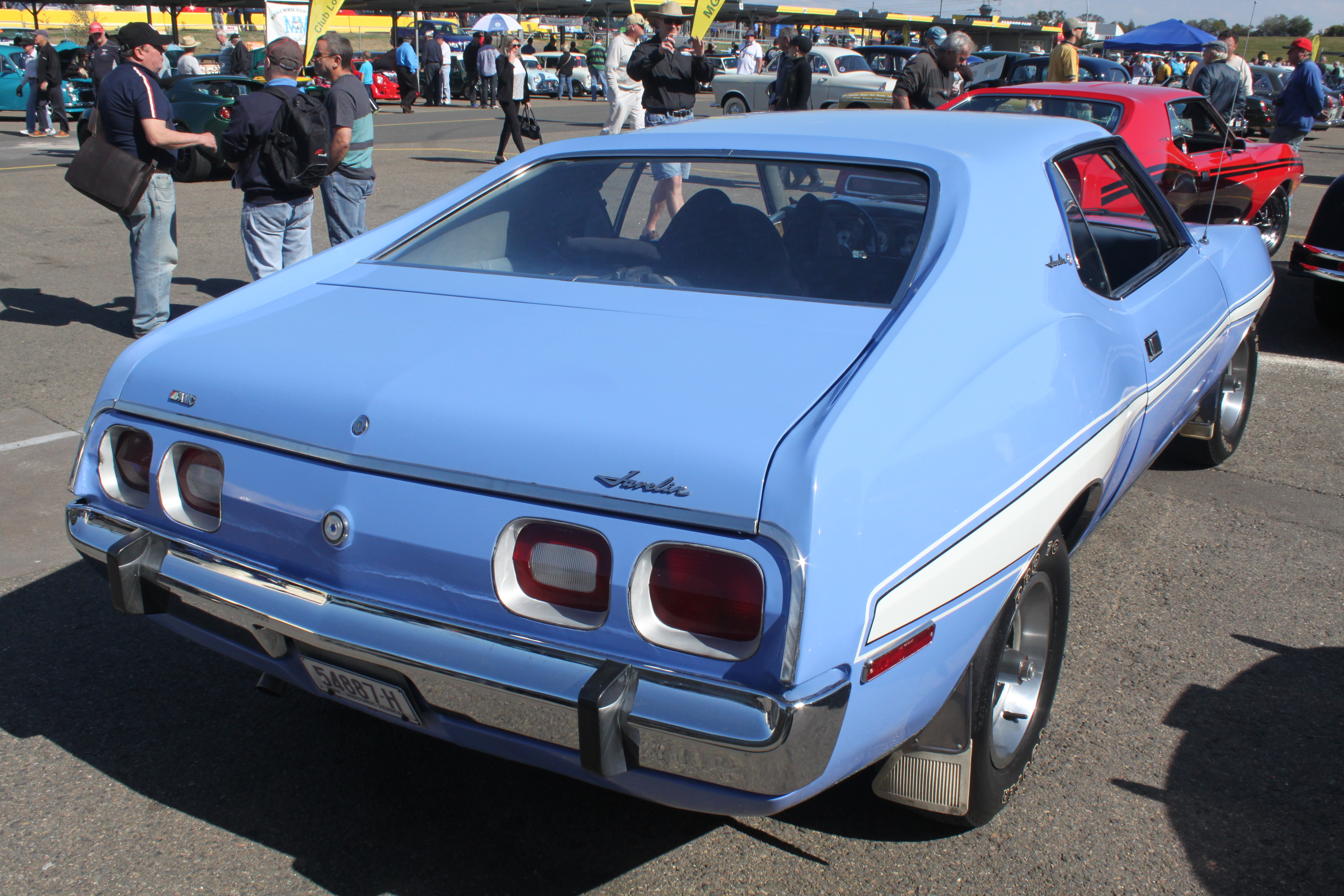
1974 AMC Javelin rear

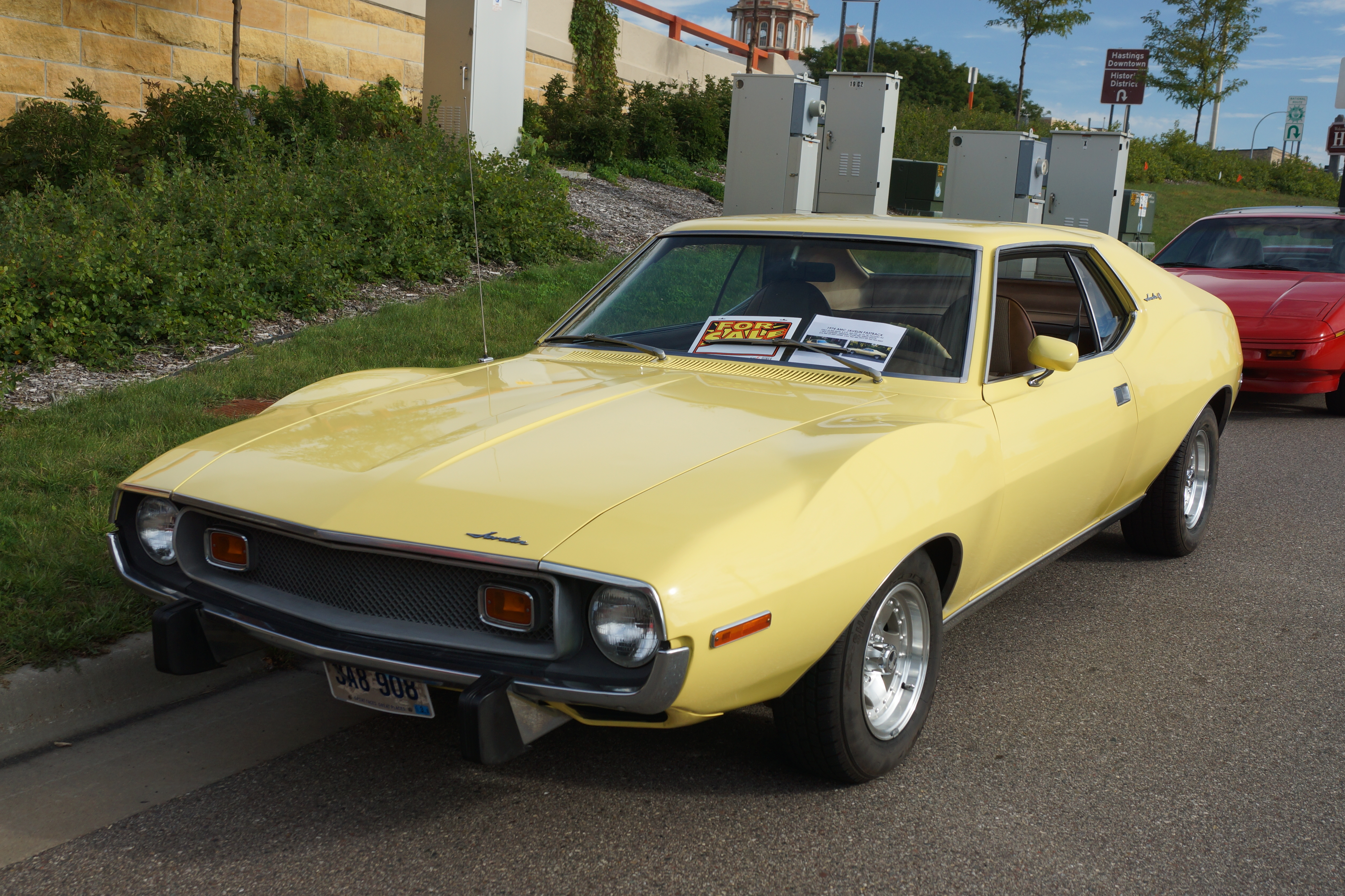
1974 AMC Javelin

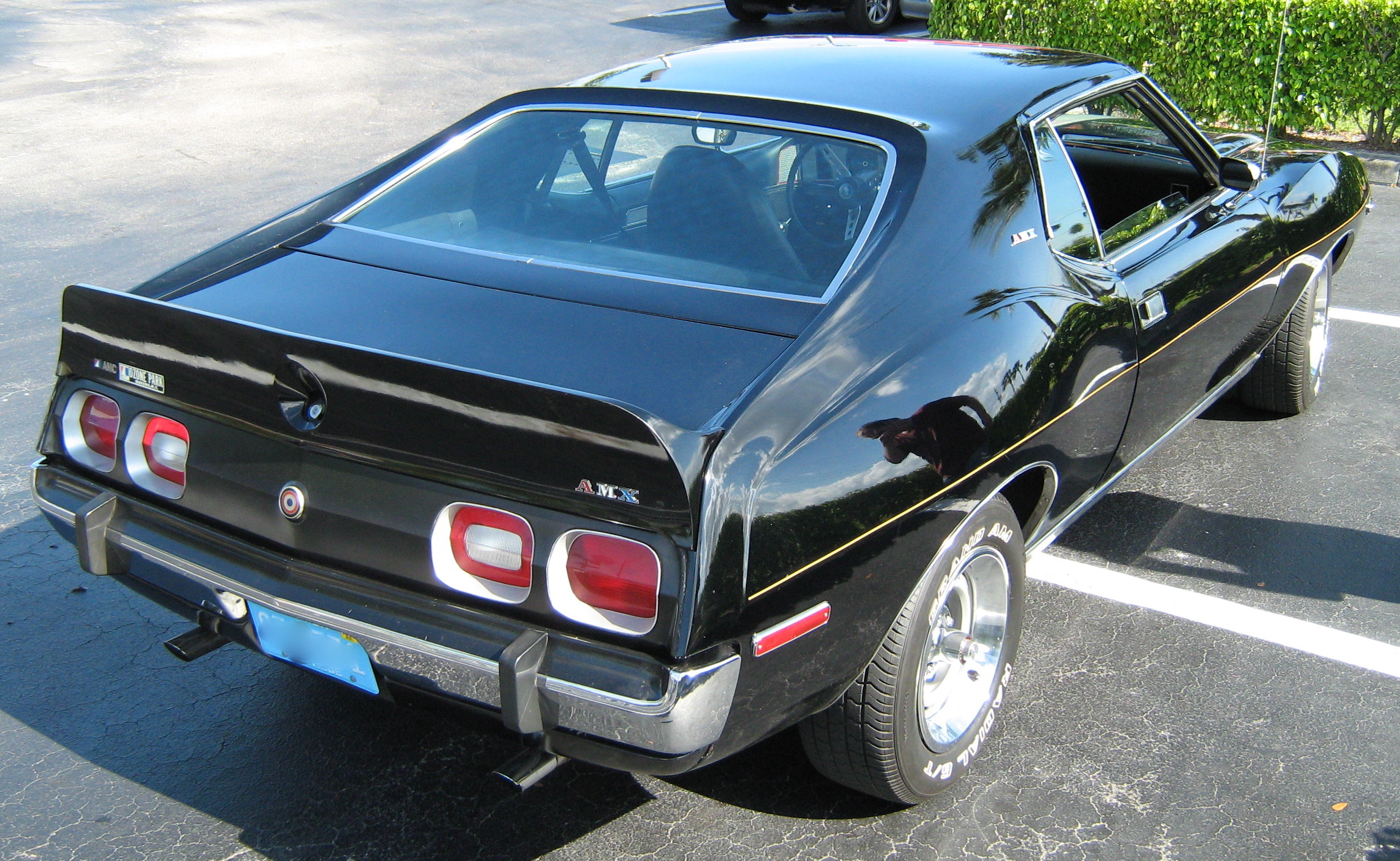
1974 Javelin AMX

=== Racing ===
Racing AMC Javelin versions competed successfully in the Trans-Am Series with the Penske Racing/Mark Donohue team, as well as with the Roy Woods ARA team sponsored by American Motors Dealers. The Javelin won the Trans-Am title in 1971, 1972, and 1976. Drivers included George Follmer and Mark Donohue.

One Javelin race car had the distinction of having different sponsors and being piloted by Mark Donohue, Vic Elford, George Follmer, Peter Revson, and Roy Woods. This Javelin began as a 1970 model, but was updated with the exterior body design of 1971 versions. The race car is now restored to its 1972 livery and is driven at Vintage Trans-Am events.

Jim Richards raced a Javelin AMX in the Touring Car Masters in Australia, coming second in the overall 2012 series. He earned second place in the 2015 Touring Car Masters (Pro Masters Class) Series.

Motorsports

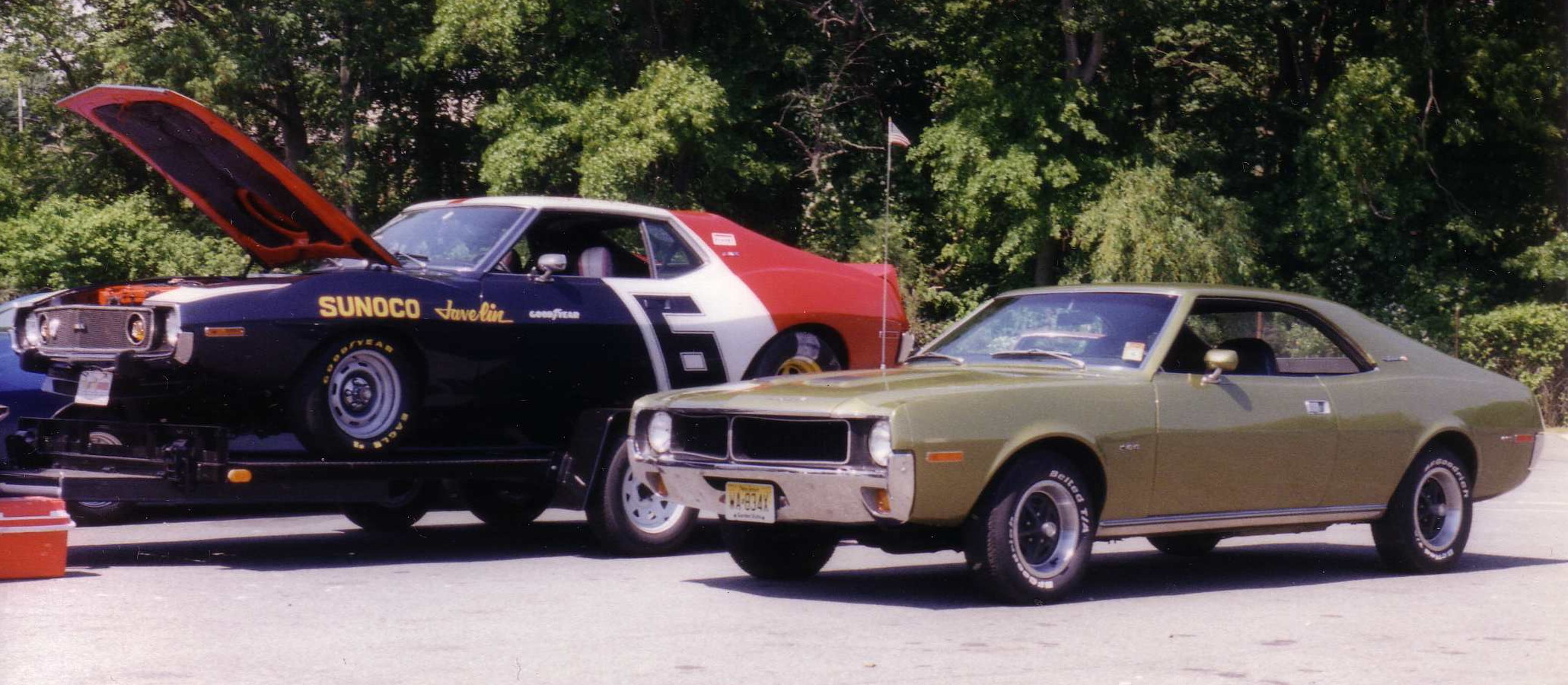
A tribute custom Javelin decorated as an SCCA Trans-Am Sunoco Javelin, and a 1970 Javelin

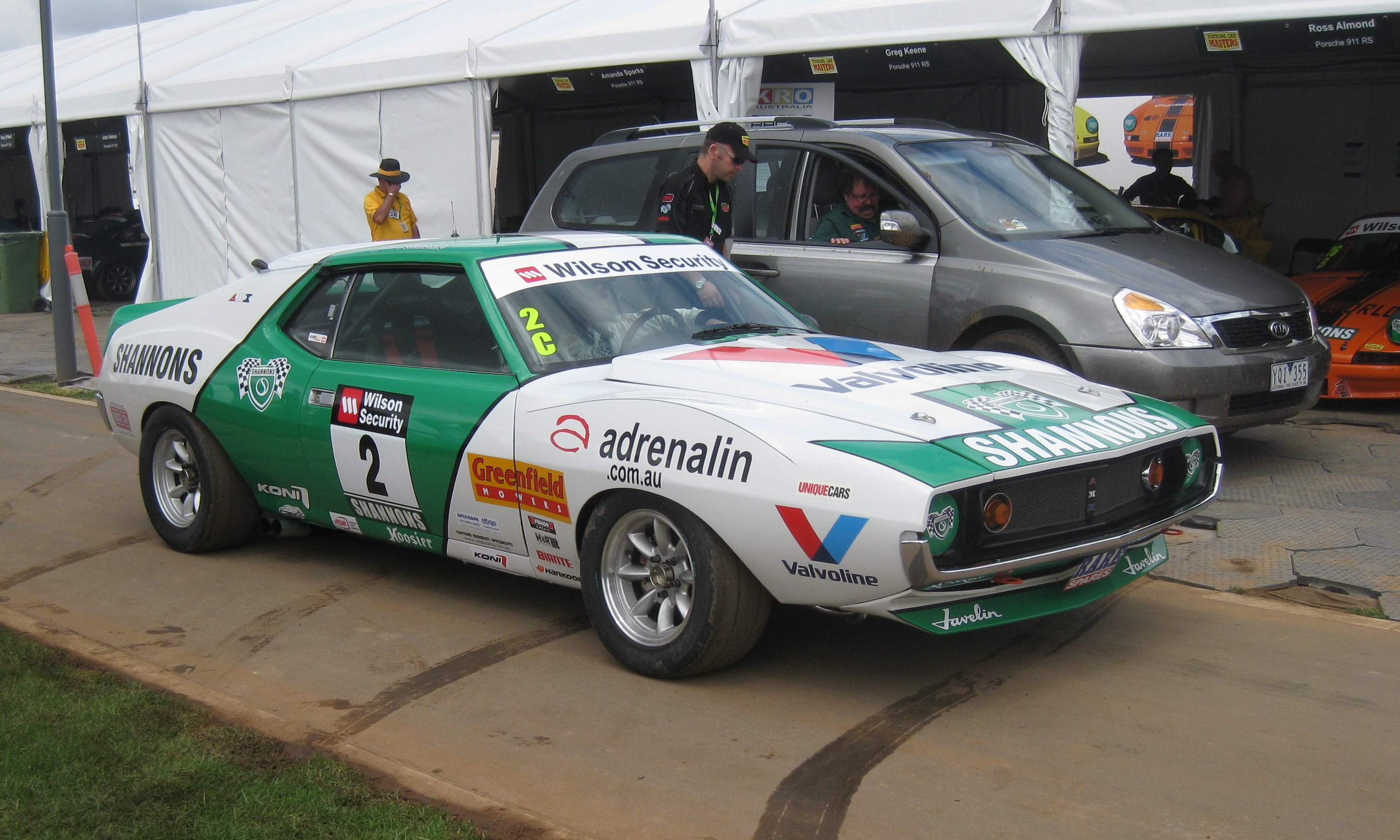
Jim Richards AMX at the Adelaide Parklands Circuit

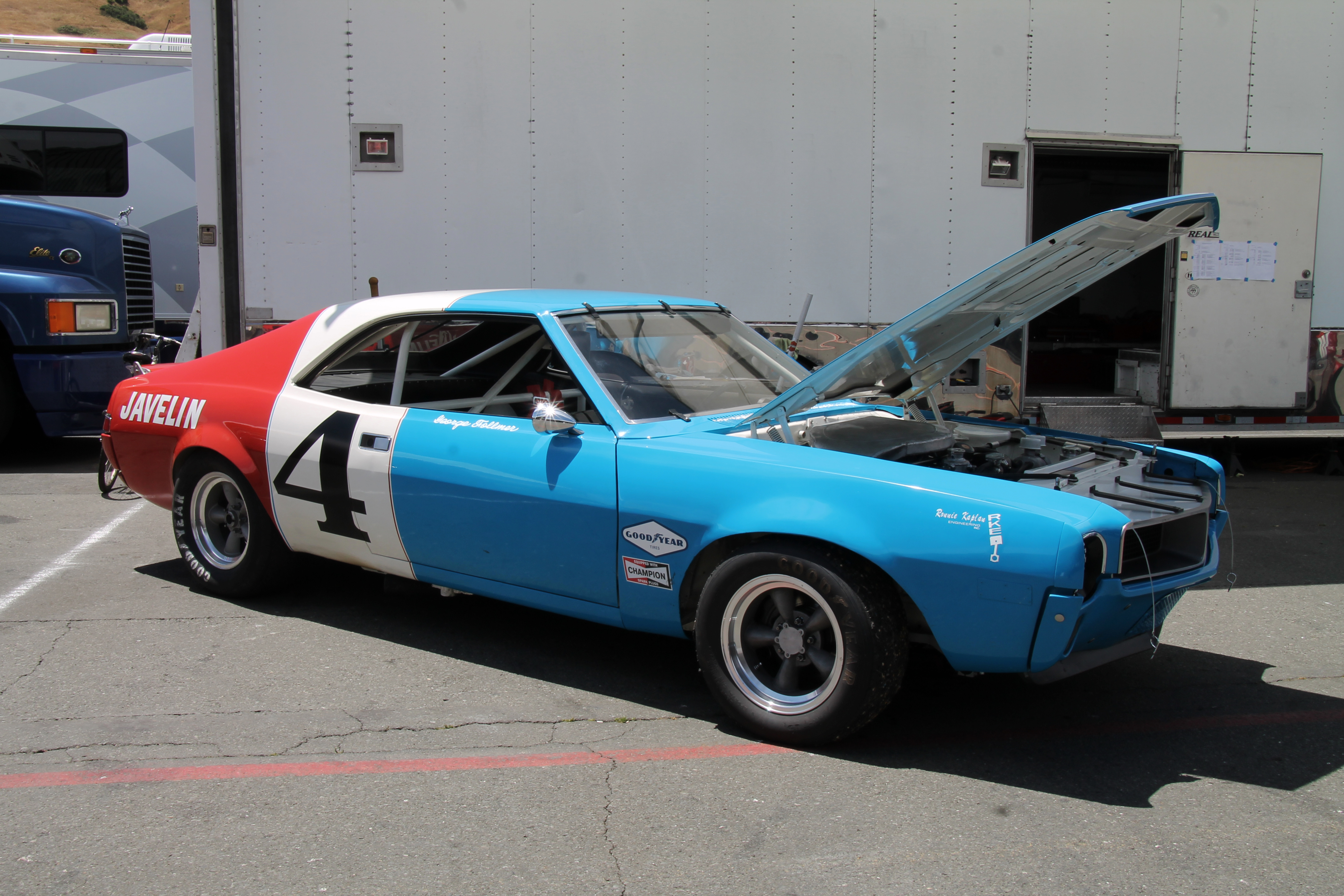
George Follmer 1968 AMC Javelin. 2nd place at the 1968 Bryar 200 Trans-Am Sedan Championship.

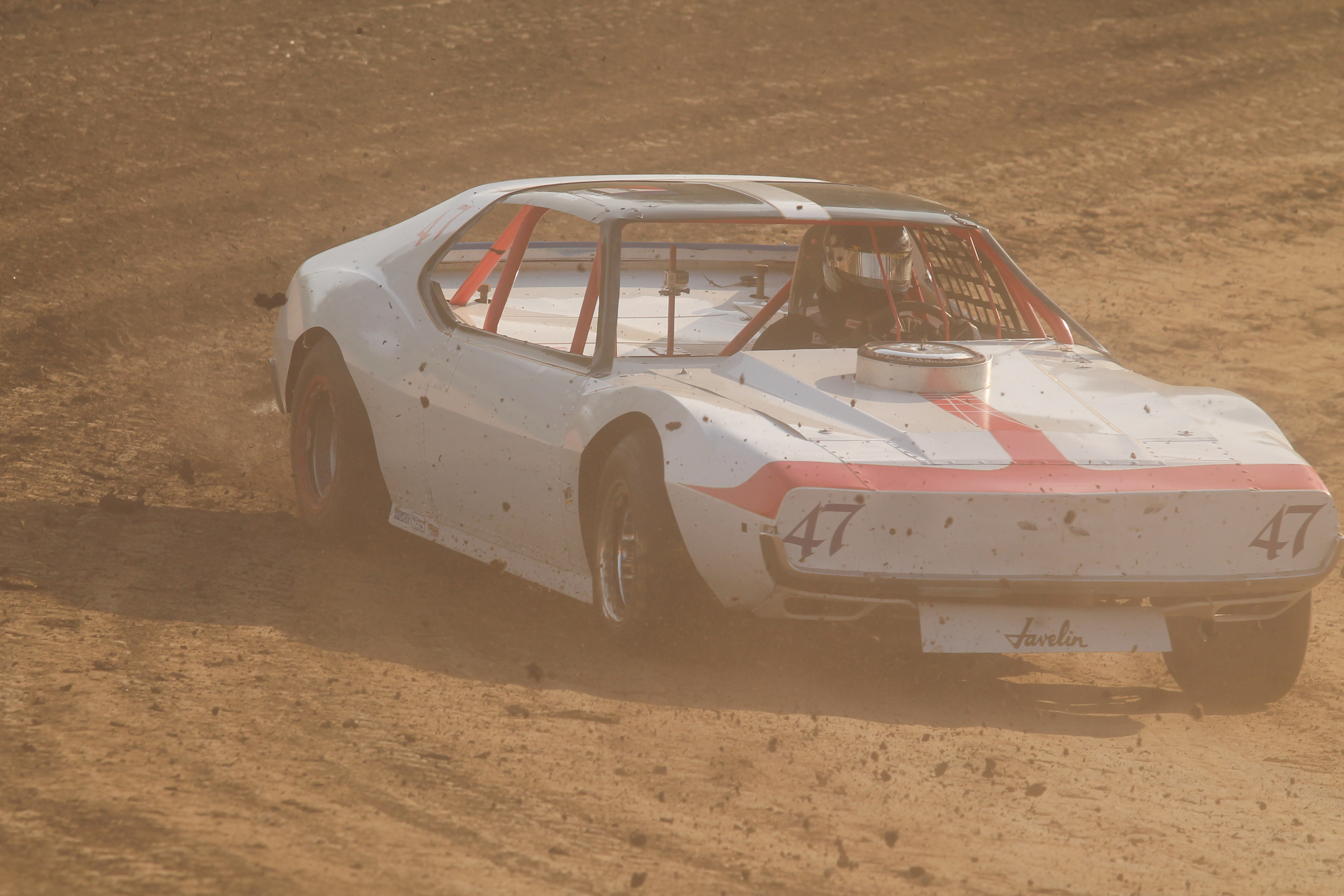
James Landis 72 Javelin Dirt track race car

== Police ==
Alabama State Trooper with 1971 AMC Javelin

Alabama faced a budget shortfall in 1971 and could not purchase a fleet of the full-sized Fords the state troopers were accustomed to. To find a more suitable and lower-priced alternative to the traditional large-sized police cruisers, the Alabama Department of Public Safety (ADPS) first took a basic 304 cu in (5.0 L) V8 as a test vehicle, found its power lacking, then sampled a vinyl roofed AMX with a 401 cu in (6.6 L) engine from the local dealer, Reinhart AMC in Montgomery. The Javelin AMX version went through the trooper reviews and became "the most abused police car in the history of Alabama." The car was eventually donated to the ADPS by Reinhardt Motors.

Law enforcement vehicles were typically full-sized sedans and could not keep up with speeders. The Javelins, equipped with the 401 cu in (6.6 L) engine, proved their performance. The Alabama Department of Public Safety (ADPS) worked with R. Pierson "Doc" Burke, the vice president of the dealership, for the Alabama Highway Patrol to use the Javelins in pursuit and high-speed response calls.

The Javelins purchased between 1971 and 1972 were the first pony cars used as regular highway patrol police cars by any U.S. law-enforcement organization. The bid price was $3,047 for the 1971 police cruisers, and $3,242 for the 1972 model year versions. This predates the use of pony cars as patrol cars by California in the early 1980s.

The 1971 cars were base model Javelins with the fleet-service 401 cu in (6.6 L) four-barrel dual-exhaust V8 that was available in the full-sized Ambassadors with police-package and cast-iron Borg-Warner three-speed automatic transmission. The cars did not have the complete "Go-Package" equipment leaving out the cowl-induction hood, limited-slip differential, and its 3.91 ratio. The cars included power disk brakes, power steering, air conditioning, heavy-duty suspension, three-core radiator, "Rally" instruments with the 140 mph speedometer, and E60x15 Polyglass tires mounted on Machine wheels, and 2.97 rear axle ratio. The slope of the decklid provided no visibility to display the 'STATE TROOPER' decal from the rear, so the rear spoiler from the AMX model was added. The holes for the model designation were filled with a '401' emblem. The ADPS ordered 61 silver and ten in various colors to serve as unmarked cars.

Changes with the 1972 Javelins included AMC's switch to the Chrysler TorqueFlite transmissions, eight-slot road wheels replaced the "Machine" design, and all cars were SST models because the base version was no longer available. The ADPS bought 12 all silver, 42 were special ordered in silver with blue hood, decklid, and spoiler, and an additional eight in various colors to serve as unmarked cars.

The ADPS added decals, a beacon, a siren, and a police radio. Archives document high-speed chases in which high-performance car drivers had to surrender to the ADPS Javelins. The cars were powerful. Their lightweight design, with the 2.87 rear axle ratio, contributed to top speeds of over 150 miles per hour (241 km/h).

Most of the ADPS Javelins were in service until June 1974. The last of the ADPS Javelins was retired in 1979. One of the original cars is now part of the museum at ADPS Headquarters. As of 2025, there are at least 16 documented ADPS Javelins in existence.

== International markets ==
American Motors was active in foreign markets via exports of complete cars as well as joint ventures and partner companies to assemble knock-down versions of its vehicles.

=== Australia ===
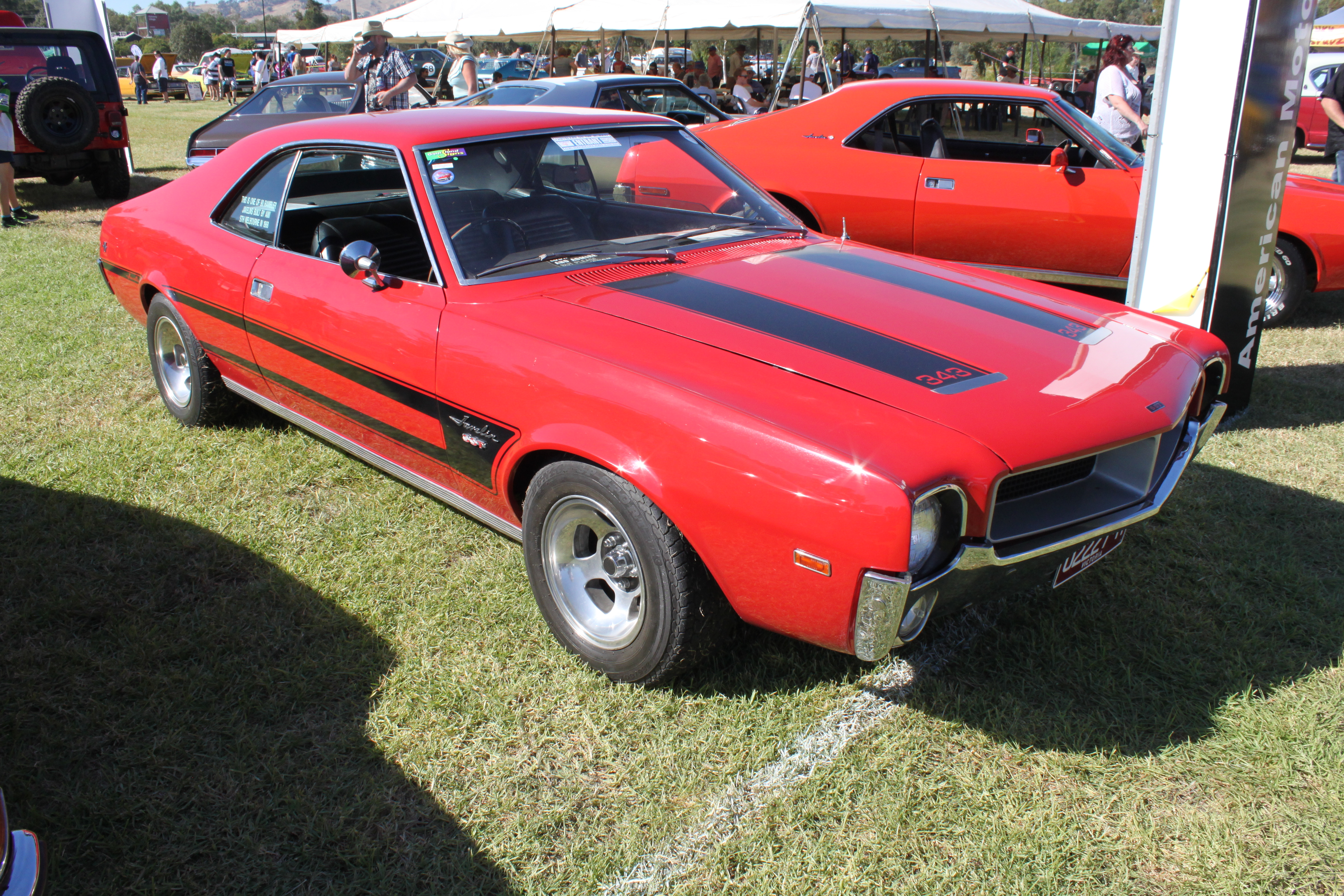
Right-hand drive 1968 Rambler Javelin built in Australia

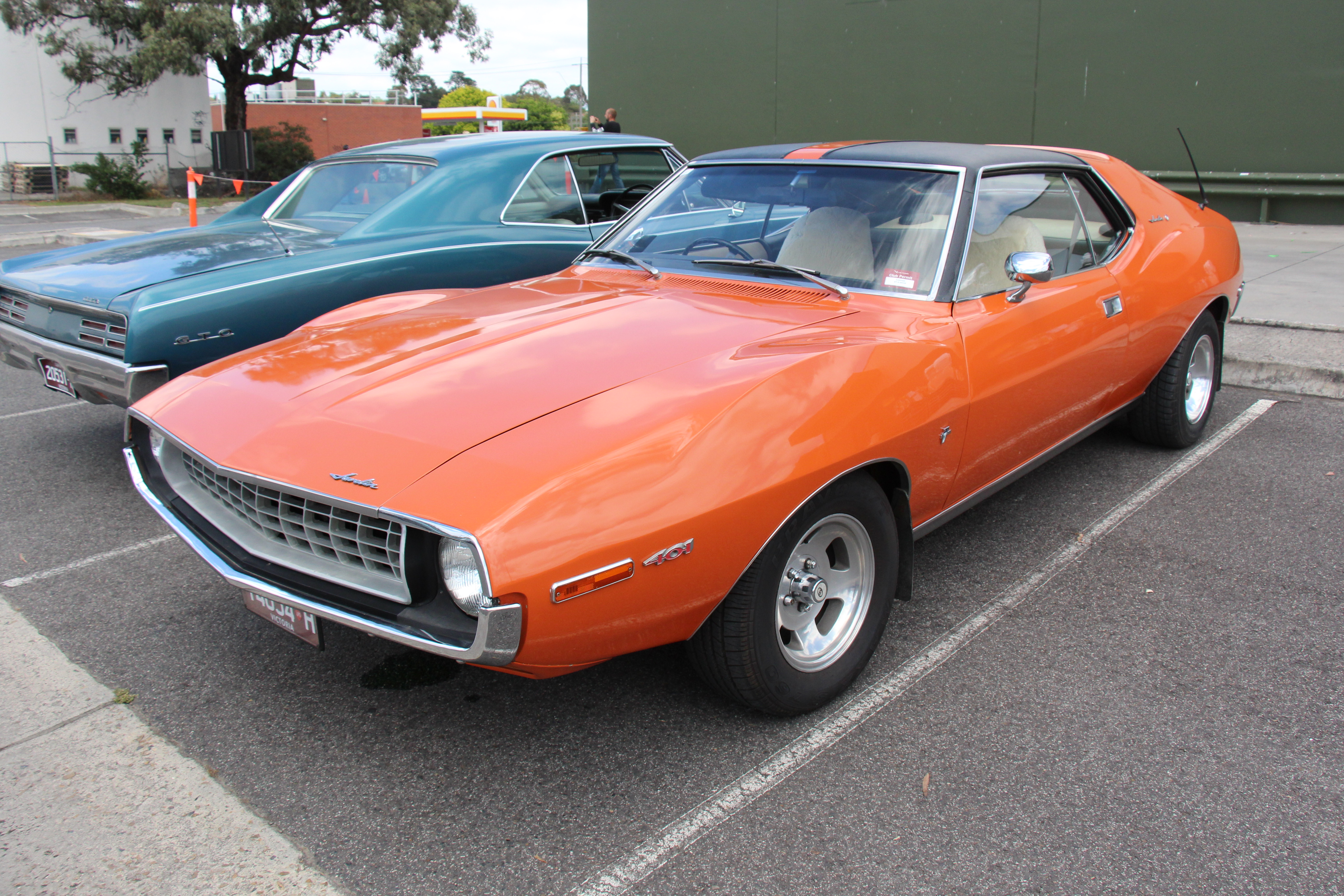
1973 Rambler Javelin, built in Australia

Australian Motor Industries (AMI) assembled right hand drive versions of both the first- and second-generation Javelin models in Victoria, Australia, from Knock-down kits. The right-hand drive dash, the interior, and soft trim, as well as other components, were locally manufactured and differed from the U.S. originals. The cars were marketed under the historic Rambler name. The AMI Rambler Javelins were the only American "muscle cars" of that era to be sold new in Australia. The Australian Javelins came with top trim and features that included the 343 cu in (5.6 L) 280 bhp (210 kW) V8 engine, three-speed "Shift Command" automatic transmission, and "Twin Grip" limited-slip rear differential. They were more expensive, had more power, and provided more luxury than the contemporary Holden Monaro.

The first generation Javelin sold for AU$7,495 in comparison to rival models, the Holden HK Monaro GTS, which sold for AU$3,790, and the Ford XT Falcon GT, which sold for AU$4,200. Sales were low, and AMI production ceased after 1972, with a total of 258 models built between 1968 and 1972.

From 1964, Rambler sales for New South Wales were managed by Sydney company Grenville Motors Pty Ltd, the State distributor of Rover and Land Rover. Grenville controlled a network of Sydney and country NSW dealers in direct communication with AMI. Australian-assembled AMC vehicles were otherwise sold in all States by independent distributors.

=== France ===
Renault had formerly assembled AMC vehicles until 1967. After Renault ceased production, the AMC Javelin was imported into France by Jacques Poch. They were also the official French importer-distributor of auto brands Škoda and Lada in Neuilly, and one of the two largest private importers of foreign automobiles in France. As with all export markets, the Javelin was marketed in France as "Rambler."

=== Germany ===
American Motors had an agreement with the importer and distributor of Jaguar and Aston Martin cars, Peter Lindner of Frankfurt am Main, to be the exclusive importer of AMC cars into West Germany and offered seven models in the marketplace.

Additionally, Javelins were built for the European market. The car was displayed on the Karmann stand at the 1968 Paris Motor Show in October. The German coach builder, known for the Volkswagen Karmann Ghia and VW Beetle convertibles, assembled 280 complete knock down (CKD) Javelins between 1968 and 1970 that were marketed in Europe. This was a significant business relationship because the Javelin was a completely American-designed car that was made in Germany. The Javelins carried the 79-K model name and a 79-K diecast emblem on the C-pillars, with K representing Karmann and 79 was the AMC body style designation. The cars had Karmann serial numbers stamped on a metal plate attached to the firewall rather than AMC Vehicle identification numbers.

The "Javelin 79-K" could be ordered with the 232 cu in (3.8 L) I6, 290 cu in (4.8 L) 2-barrel, or 343 cu in (5.6 L) 4-barrel V8 engines. Transmissions for the six were a three-speed manual on the floor or an optional automatic on the column, the 290 V8 had the standard manual or optional console-mounted automatic, while the 343 V8 came only with the center console automatic transmission. Thirteen cars were delivered with the 3-speed manual transmission. About 90% of the parts and components came in crates from the United States. The speedometers were in "km/h" and the headlights were European specification Karmann supplied the interior upholstery and paint. A choice of six colors was available: White, Cherry Red, Bahama Yellow, Pacific Blue, Bristol Grey, and Irish Green. At Karmann's facility in Rheine, the cars were assembled, painted, and test-driven before shipment to customers.

=== Mexico ===
Vehículos Automotores Mexicanos (VAM) assembled Javelins in Mexico under license and partial ownership (40% equity share) by AMC from 1968 through 1973. The VAM versions were equipped with different, locally made components, trim, and interiors compared to the equivalent AMC-made models. The Mexican-built Javelins came in only one version. They had more standard equipment compared to U.S. and Canadian models. The Javelin was the first VAM model not to carry the Rambler name in Mexico; AMC's cases were the Marlin and Ambassador models in 1966.

==== 1968 ====
The Javelin was introduced in Mexico by VAM on 1 April 1968, making the model a "1968 and a half" similar to the February 1968 debut of the two-seat AMX. The Javelin represented the third line in VAM's product mix for the first time and the first regular-production, high-end, sports-oriented model. It would eventually become the only AMC muscle car marketed in Mexico. Other AMC muscle cars were equivalents built by VAM or as special editions, such as the 1979 American 06/S taking the place of the 1971 Hornet SC/360, the 1972 Classic Brougham hardtop taking the place of the 1970 Rebel Machine, and the 1971 Matador Machine, plus the 1969 Shelby Rambler Go Pack taking the place of the 1969 Hurst SC/Rambler. The Javelin introduced many firsts for VAM, such as a standard four-speed manual transmission and, for the first time in a regular production model, the option of a three-speed automatic transmission from the factory. These transmissions were the only types available in the Javelin, and all came with floor-mounted shifters, just like the two-seater AMX. Cars with the automatic included a center console with a locking compartment and power drum brakes at no extra cost.

The 1968 VAM Javelin featured the 155 hp (116 kW; 157 PS), 8.5:1 compression ratio 232 cu in (3.8 L) I6 engine with a two-barrel Carter WCD carburetor, a 3.54:1 rear differential gear ratio, 12-inch heavy-duty clutch, manual four-wheel drum brakes, quick-ratio manual steering, electric wipers, electric washers, 8,000 RPM tachometer, 200 km/h speedometer, AM radio, cigarette lighter, front ashtray, locking glove box, courtesy lights, day-night rearview mirror, padded sun visors, two-point front seatbelts, low-back reclining bucket seats, rear ashtray, dual C-pillar-mounted dome lights, dual coat hooks, sports steering wheel, driver's side remote mirror, side armrests, vinyl door panels with woodgrain accents, bright moldings on top of the doors and rocker panels plus hood and fender extension edges, wheel covers, 7.35x14 tires, protective side moldings, and front fender-mounted Javelin emblems.

The standard trim and features make the VAM Javelin equivalent to the U.S. and Canadian AMC Javelin SST. Factory options included power drum brakes with a manual transmission, power steering, heater, passenger-side remote mirror, remote-controlled driver's-side mirror, custom sport wheels, and rear bumper guards. Dealer-installed options included front sway bar, side decals, light group, map pouches, vinyl roof, locking gas cap, license plate frames, mud flaps, AM/FM radio, front disk brakes, heavy-duty adjustable shocks, trunk lid rack, and many others.

A unique dealer-installed option was also VAM's "Go Pack". This consisted of manual front disk brakes, heavy-duty suspension with front sway bar (regular production unit) plus rear torsion and traction bars, aluminum four-barrel intake manifold with four-barrel Carter carburetor, headers with equal-length tubes and dual final outlets, dual exhausts, ported head with larger valves, and heavy-duty springs, 302-degree camshaft, Hurst linkage for the manual transmission, "Rallye Pak" auxiliary gauges on the dashboard (different from AMC's original units), exclusive steering wheel, exclusive dual remote mirrors, and exclusive turbine wheels. The performance upgrades of the Go Pack represented a 40% increase in engine output, making the VAM Javelin far more competitive against its V8-powered rivals from Ford de Mexico, General Motors de Mexico, and Automex (Chrysler de Mexico).

Despite lacking a V8 engine, the VAM Javelin succeeded in sales and public opinion.

==== 1969 ====
The 1969 VAM Javelins included a heater as standard, the foot pedals added bright trim, the accelerator was changed to a firewall-mounted unit, a grab strap was added on the passenger-side dashboard above the glove box, and the center cover with the radio speaker grid was changed to a woodgrain version. The 1969 VAM Javelin retained the 1968 gauges, in contrast to AMC's 1969 modifications to the Javelin (and AMX) instrument panel, which featured a larger 8,000 RPM tach on the right pod, leaving the smaller left pod exclusive to the clock and placing all gauges closer to the driver. As with AMC versions, VAM introduced a hooded surround for the tach and speedometer midyear. The VAM Javelin's exterior now included a bright trim package with new moldings starting at the corners of the taillights, running along the sides to the lower rear corner of the side glass and the drip rails, plus all around the rear glass and the top edge of the C-pillars. Although accessories were factory-issued, a vinyl roof cover was only available at the dealer level. The front fender emblems were relocated to each C-pillar's base and accompanied by red-white-blue bull's eye emblems. A third Javelin emblem was mounted near the lower right corner of the grille, accompanied by its respective bull's-eye unit.

The 1969 model year was also VAM's first engineered engine: the 170 hp (127 kW; 172 PS), 9.5:1 compression ratio 252 cu in (4.1 L) I6 engine with a two-barrel Carter WCD carburetor and a new VAM-engineered 266-degree camshaft in both standard and Go Pack versions. This engine positioned the Javelin as a performance model compared to its first year.

==== 1970 ====
The 1970 VAM Javelin followed the AMC redesign. The VAM versions included the same features as their AMC counterparts, but with new wheel cover designs resembling Magnum 500 wheels. Two hood designs were available: a center bulge with two simulated air intakes, or a smoother version with two rectangular, strip-trimmed pieces. The functional Ram Air system was unavailable because VAM Javelins lacked V8 engines.

Changes to the interior included a new collapsible steering column with a built-in ignition switch; it incorporated a safety and anti-theft lock that extended not only to the steering wheel but also to the transmission shifters. It required the levers to be placed in either Reverse (manual) or Park (automatic) positions for the switch to engage the lock and allow the driver to retrieve the key. Also new was a two-arm sports steering wheel with three simulated spokes and a central bull's-eye emblem. The dashboard was redesigned, including full-width woodgrain trim and the three-pod instrumentation. Despite this change in dashboard design, the three gauges remained unchanged from the previous two years. A new shifter and console design were featured with the automatic transmission, and the door panels were revised. Despite their new upholstery design for the year, the front seats were still the same low-back reclining units without headrests as the previous years, while AMC had already switched to high-back front seats for its equivalent model.

A new front suspension design featured dual control arms and ball joints. All VAM Javelins with four-speed manual transmissions now included a Hurst linkage as factory-installed equipment. It was previously available only with the optional Go Pack package and, separately, at certain dealerships. A mid-year change replaced the imported Borg-Warner T10 manual transmission with the Querétaro-produced TREMEC (Transmisiones y Equipos Mecánicos) 170-F four-speed model to comply with the domestic content requirements of at least 60% of all car components..

==== 1971 ====
The year 1971 represented a complete turnaround for VAM. The new Camioneta Rambler American, based on the Hornet Sportabout, was introduced; the Rambler Classic gained all the features of AMC's new Matador; and the second-generation Javelin was introduced.

On the outside, the VAM Javelin was the same as its redesigned AMC counterpart, except for the wheel covers, with no factory stripes or decals. A unique feature of the second-generation VAM Javelin was round porthole opera windows mounted on the C-pillars, installed by some VAM dealerships with or without vinyl roofs.

The standard engine was the new 200 hp (149 kW; 203 PS), 9.5:1 compression ratio, 282 cu in (4.6 L) I6 engine with a Carter ABD two-barrel carburetor. It was VAM's second engineered engine, taking the Javelin to performance levels comparable to its V8 competition. The Go Pack version of this engine was the most powerful. Two "4.6" emblems on the front fenders identified the new engine. The only other change was a 3.07:1 rear differential gear ratio for cars with automatic transmissions.

The interior featured all-new, non-reclining high-back bucket seats with embossed "J" emblems on the built-in headrests and on the center of the rear seatback. The dashboard included woodgrain overlays, and the instrument cluster differed from that of the AMC Javelins, as in all previous models. The right pod housed a clock-and-tachometer hybrid with the same design and appearance as the U.S. Rallye Pak units, except it was calibrated for six-cylinder engines rather than V8S. The center pod had a 240 km/h speedometer, a range equivalent to the 140 mph U.S. unit, but the colors, graphics, and typography of the dial were the same as the standard gauges. This created a high contrast between the speedometer and the clock/tack hybrid. The pod on the left contained only fuel and water temperature gauges, with no US Rallye Pak ammeter or oil pressure gauges. Warning lights were for oil pressure, the electrical system, and the brakes. Following the AMC Javelins, the VAM versions featured a single dome light at the center of the headliner and a new brake pedal design for cars with automatic transmissions.

==== 1972 ====
All the quality and engineering upgrades and revisions incorporated into AMC cars for 1972 were also present in the vehicles built in Mexico. The 1972 VAM Javelin saw considerable improvements in both performance and sportiness. Heavy-duty suspension (stronger springs and shocks, along with the front sway bar) became standard equipment. Front disk brakes replaced the previous drums as a factory issue and were power-assisted regardless of transmission. The power steering system became standard in units ordered with the automatic transmission. Cars equipped with the four-speed manual transmission now came with a 3.31:1 rear ratio. The "Shift-Command" Borg-Warner automatic transmissions were replaced by the new "Torque Command" Chrysler-built A998 TorqueFlite.

The 1972 VAM Javelins followed the AMC versions' rectangular-grid front grille and matching chromed taillamp overlay. For the first time, the exterior included factory stripe designs. The interior saw new seat patterns and a new three-spoke sports steering wheel with an "American Motors" logo on the transparent plastic cap of the horn button. A new steering column design with a built-in safety lever to engage the steering lock came, while the mechanism linking the shifter to the ignition switch was discontinued.

==== 1973 ====
For the 1973 model year, the VAM Javelin received mostly cosmetic changes. The car incorporated the new, smaller rectangular grille design with integrated rectangular parking lights and a mesh grille; the hollow vents under the front of the fenders were covered in black, and the "TV screen" taillight design featured a more prominent central bull's-eye emblem between them. The interior saw new, original seat patterns and, for the first time in the model, a center console for the four-speed manual transmission. Mechanically, the car was the same as the year before, except for a new engine head design with independent rockers instead of the flute-type shaft, and power steering was made standard equipment on units with the manual transmission. Except for the lack of intake porting, these heads were the same units used in the Go Pack engines. These were the most potent VAM Javelins made in stock condition until that point. The second-generation Javelins were not available with cowl induction hoods.

The 1974 sales were lower than the previous season, and the Mexican government's scheduled engine emission certification the following year would take a toll on all high-compression gasoline engines produced in the country. Moreover, the need to add the smaller Gremlin model and the company's perception that the upcoming new Matador coupe model (renamed Classic AMX for the local market) could take the position as the image builder and enthusiast generator of the marque prompted VAM to discontinue the Javelin at the end of the 1973 model year, one year before AMC's production of the Javelin ended in the United States.

=== Philippines ===
The Philippines was almost exclusively an American car market until 1941. The post-WWII years saw an influx of European cars entering the market. Despite a saturation of international brands, American Motors Corporation established a presence, and the Rambler Classic and Rambler American were locally assembled in the Philippines by Luzon Machineries, Rizal Avenue, Manila.

Luzon Machineries later assembled the 1968 through 1970 AMC Javelins. The Javelin was one of only two "pony cars" available in the Philippines, the other being the Chevrolet Camaro. The Philippine-assembled Javelin came only with AMC's 258 cu in (4.2 L) I6 engines due to the national tax restrictions.

In 1970, Luzon Machineries began to end passenger vehicle manufacturing, and only a dozen Javelins were assembled during the final year.

=== Switzerland ===
Beginning in 1970, Zurich automotive importer J.H Heller AG began importing the AMC Javelin, the Gremlin, and later the Pacer models. Swiss market vehicles were shipped from AMC's Canadian plant.

=== United Kingdom ===
American Motors exported factory right-hand-drive vehicles to the United Kingdom, built at the Brampton plant in Ontario, Canada. These were marketed in the United Kingdom by Rambler Motors (A.M.C.) Ltd in Chiswick, West London. The Chiswick plant had previously assembled Hudson, Essex, and Terraplane vehicles since 1926 and had become a subsidiary of AMC in 1961, after that importing complete AMC vehicles. The Chiswick depot also became the Rambler parts center for the United Kingdom, Europe, and the Middle East. They also kept parts for Hudson and the English-built Austin Metropolitan.

For 1968, the U.K market Javelin was available only in left-hand-drive. From 1969 U.K-market Javelins were exported in factory right-hand-drive.

=== Venezuela ===
Constructora Venezolana de Vehículos C.A. of Venezuela was a subsidiary of AMC beginning in 1967. The firm assembled AMC Javelins from 1968 until 1974 in its Caracas, Venezuela facility.

The Venezuelan 1968 Javelin was equipped with the 290 cu in (4.8 L) V8 engine. In 1969, it came with the 343 cu in (5.6 L) with automatic or four-speed manual transmission. 1970 saw the Javelin with 360 cu in (5.9 L) automatic or four-speed manual, while the optional 390 cu in (6.4 L) was only available with the four-speed transmission.

For the 1972–1974 (second-generation) Javelins, the only powertrain available for the Venezuelan market was AMC's 360 cu in (5.9 L) with a 4-barrel carburetor coupled to the Chrysler automatic transmission.

== Legacy ==
The introduction of the Javelin was an "image Buster" and evidence of AMC at work "reinventing itself — from a maker of small, plain economy cars to a full-line automobile manufacturer with a complete range of vehicles." "Over the following six years, the eclectic and polarizing AMC Javelin would go down as one of the most underrated and often underappreciated performance cars in American history."

The Chicago Sun-Times auto editor Dan Jedlicka wrote that the Javelin, which he describes as "beautifully sculpted" and "one of the best-looking cars of the 1960s", is "finally gaining the respect of collectors, along with higher prices." The first generation Javelin has also been described as a "fun and affordable American classic with a rich racing pedigree and style that will always stand out from the omnipresent packs of Ford, General Motors, and Chrysler pony cars." The AMC Javelin does not command the high prices of some other muscle and pony cars. Still, it offers collectors the same style and spirit. The Javelin is among the "highly prized" models among AMC fans. Moreover, in its day, the Javelin sold in respectable numbers, regularly outselling the Plymouth Barracuda and Dodge Challenger popular with collectors today.

The Antique Automobile Club of America (AACA) divides the "muscle" AMC Javelins into two categories: Class 36-e for 1968 and 1969 Javelin base and SST models equipped from the factory with 343 cu in (5.6 L) 4-barrel or larger V8 engines; and Class 36-j for the 1970 through 1974 Javelin, SST, and AMX models equipped from the factory with 360 cu in (5.9 L) four-barrel or larger V8 engines. Javelins built with smaller engines compete in the regular AMC classes according to their respective decade of production.

According to estimates from the 2006 Collector Car Price Guide, some of the desirable extras include the V8 engines, particularly the 390 and 401 versions, as well as the "Go" package and distinctive models, including original "Big Bad" paint cars. The 1970 Mark Donohue Javelin is highly desired, with factory original examples commanding price premiums. A fully documented Donohue Javelin scored the most points in the OE Certified judging and earned the 1999 Mopar Muscle-sponsored Best of Show award. The 1971 through 1974 AMX versions also command higher prices, according to several collector price guides. The 1973 Trans Am Victory edition also adds a premium, according to several classic car appraisal listings. However, the distinguishing decal is readily available and has been added to many Javelins. The book Keith Martin's Guide to Car Collecting describes the cars as providing "style, power, nostalgia, and fun by venturing off the beaten path ... these overlooked cars offer great value" and includes the 1971 through 1974 Javelins as one of "nine muscle car sleepers."

Both first- and second-generation Javelins have been modified for more speed, handling, or acceleration. Some have been built as race-legal or race-ready tribute cars or replicas made to resemble AMC's factory-backed Trans-Am racers.

There are active AMC automobile clubs, including owners interested in dragstrip and racing in vintage events, such as the National American Motors Drivers & Racers Association (NAMDRA). The Javelin shared numerous mechanical, body, and trim parts with other AMC models, and there are vendors specializing at AMC shows and swap meets specializing in new old stock (NOS) as well as reproduction components.

A customized 1972 AMC Javelin AMX powered by a "Hellcat" Hemi was prepared for the 2017 Specialty Equipment Market Association SEMA show. The cusomizing company owners had known about a Javelin in their hometown for many years and finally acquired it for this project. The wheelbase was extended 6.5 in (165 mm) by placing the front wheels forward and adding a new carbon fiber front fenders, hood, and grille. The engine is a 6.2-liter Hemi Mopar fitted with a Whipple 4.5-liter supercharger and tuned to Wegner Motorsports to produce 1,036 hp (773 kW). The car was built for Prestone (maker of antifreeze and other fluids) and is called "Defiant".

Collector and custom Javelins

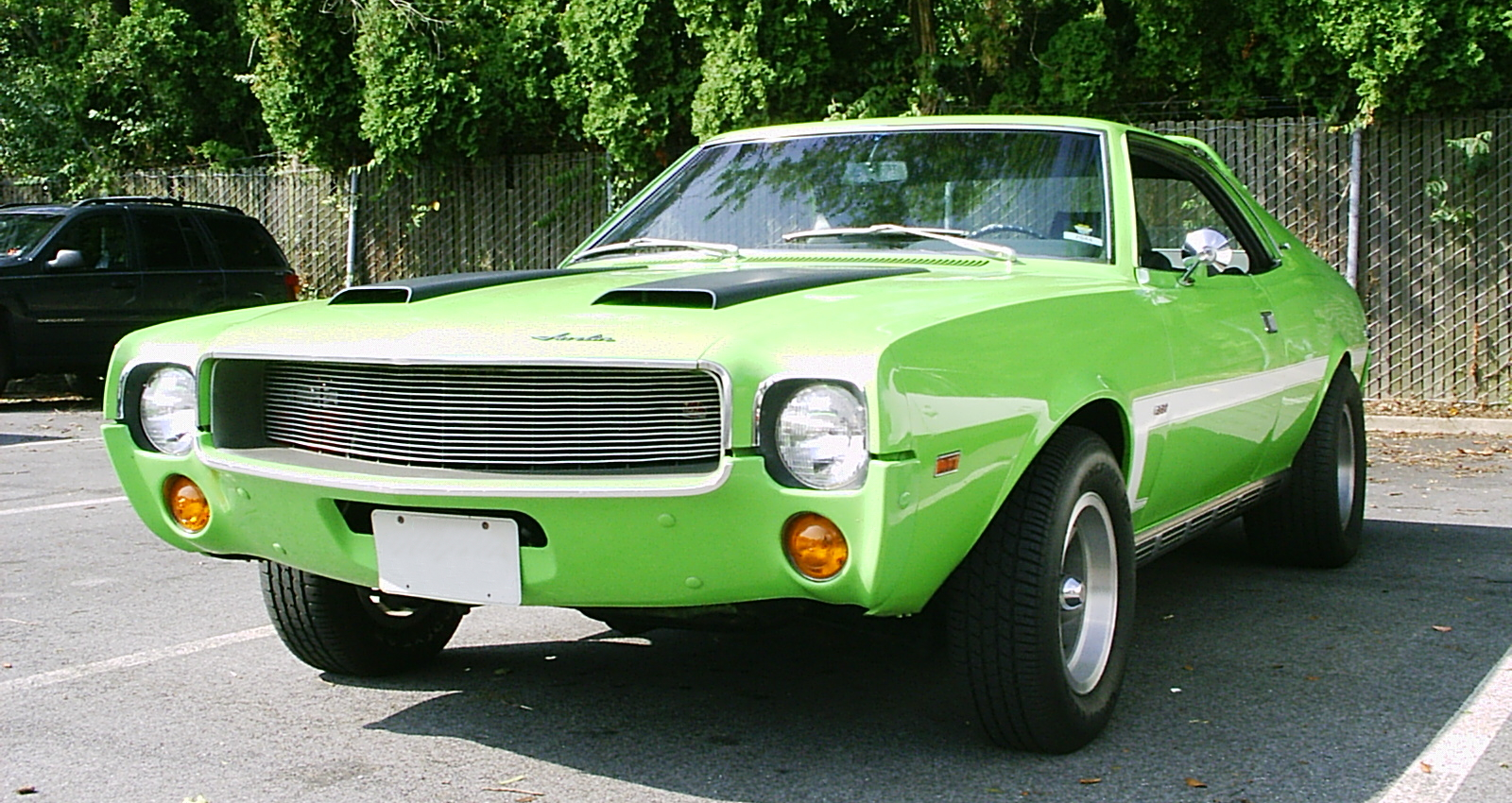
1969 "Mod" Javelin with AMX grille

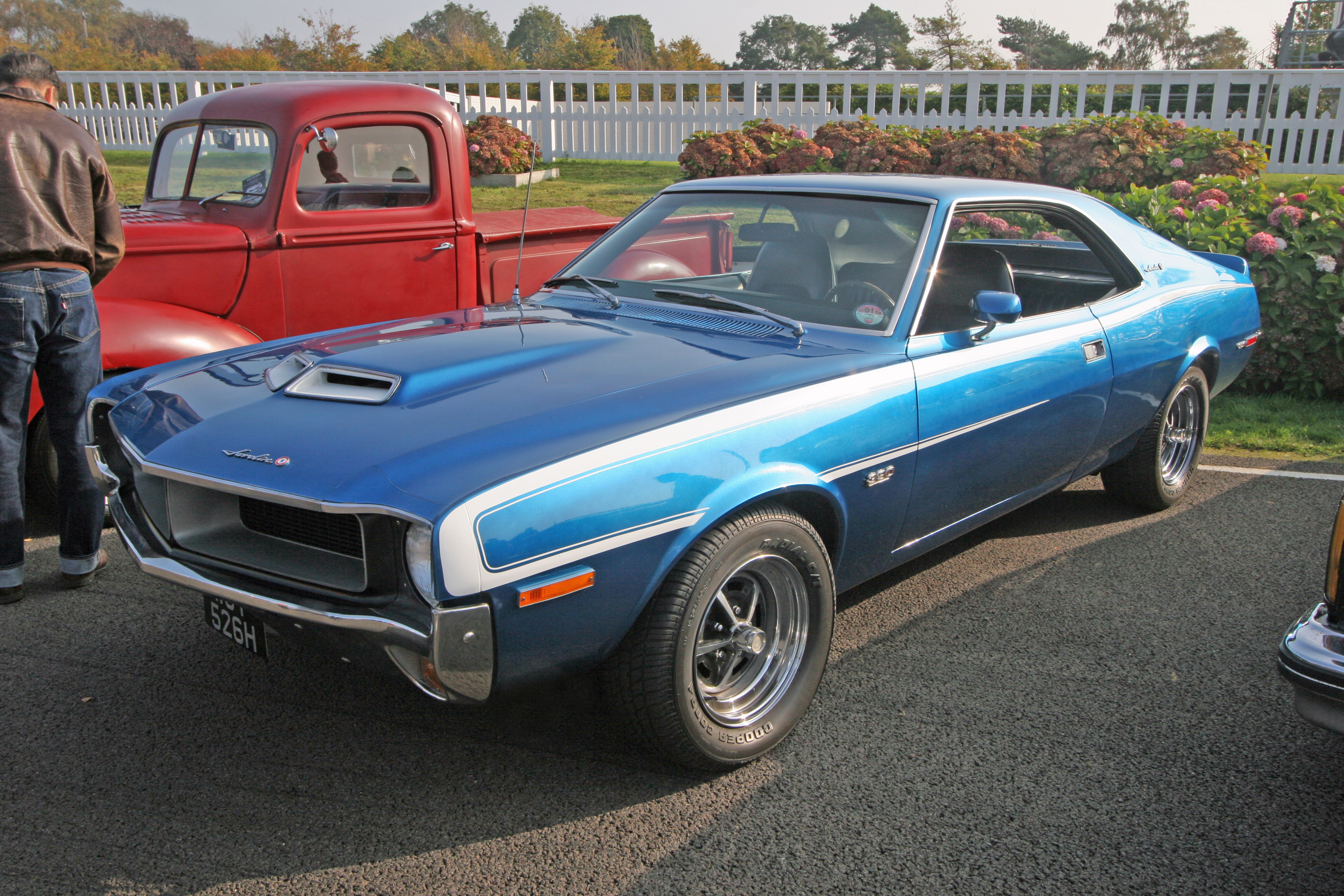
1970 Javelin in England

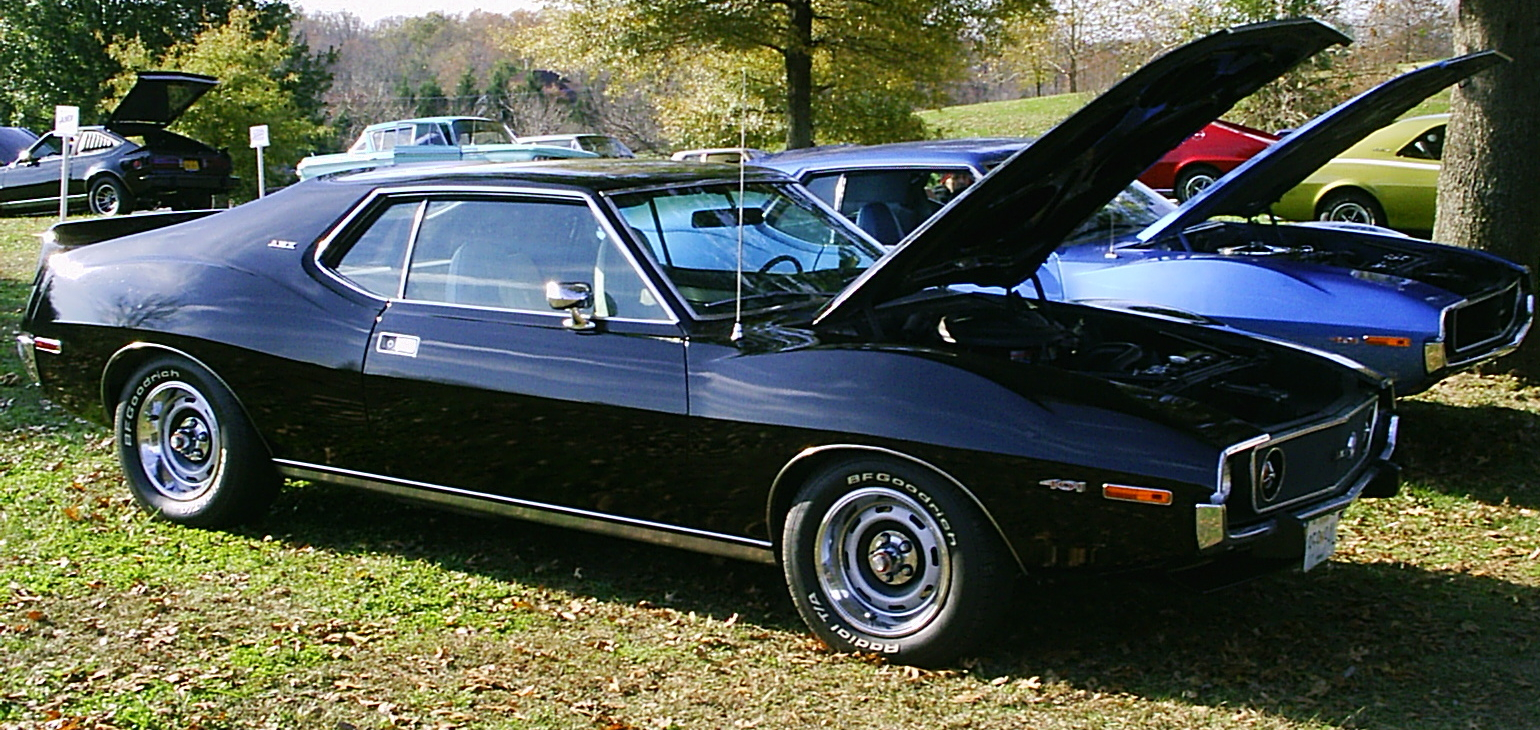
1973 Javelin AMX with 401 V8

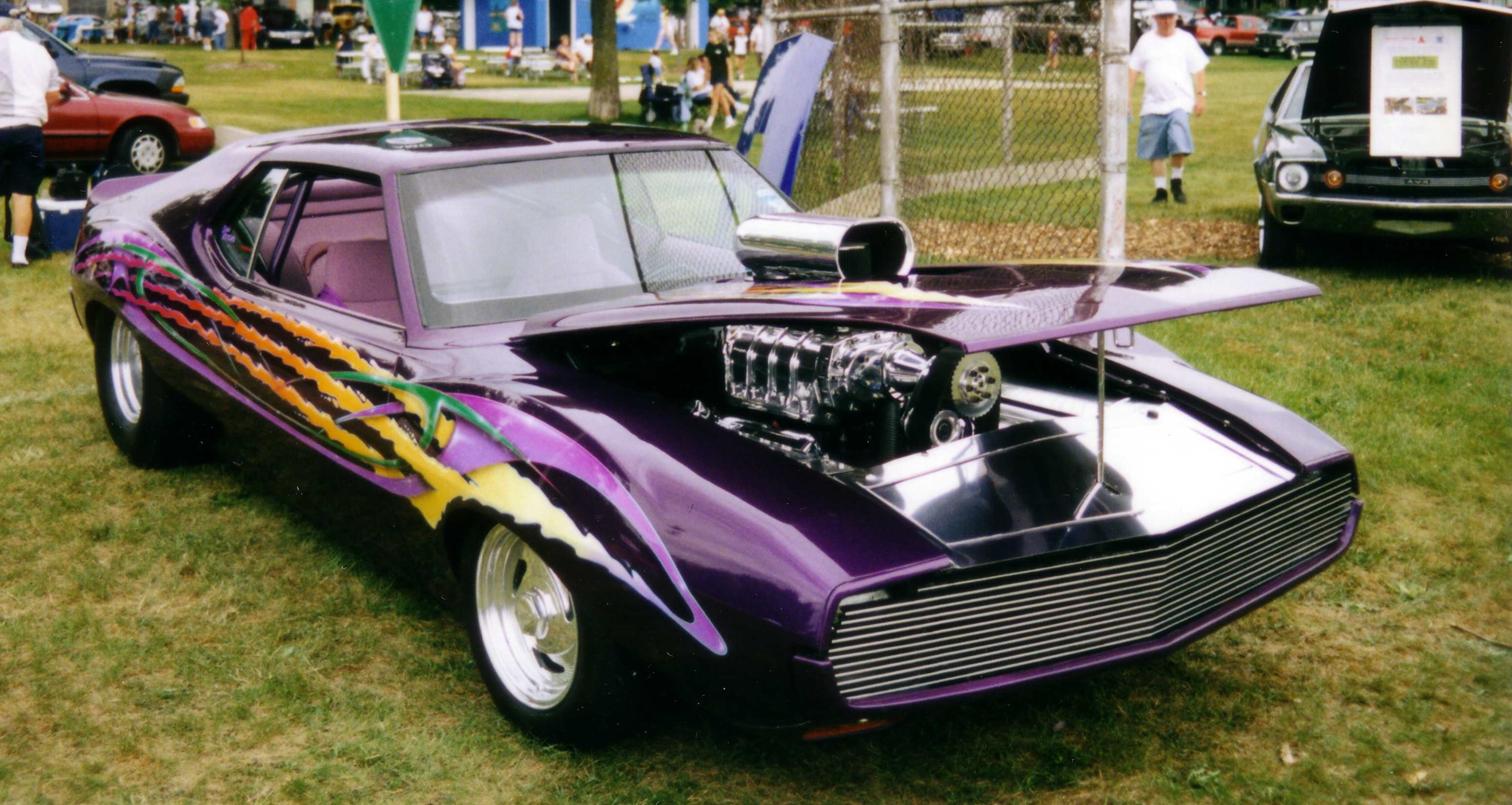
Custom supercharged AMC V8
