= Touring Car Masters =

Australian motor racing series

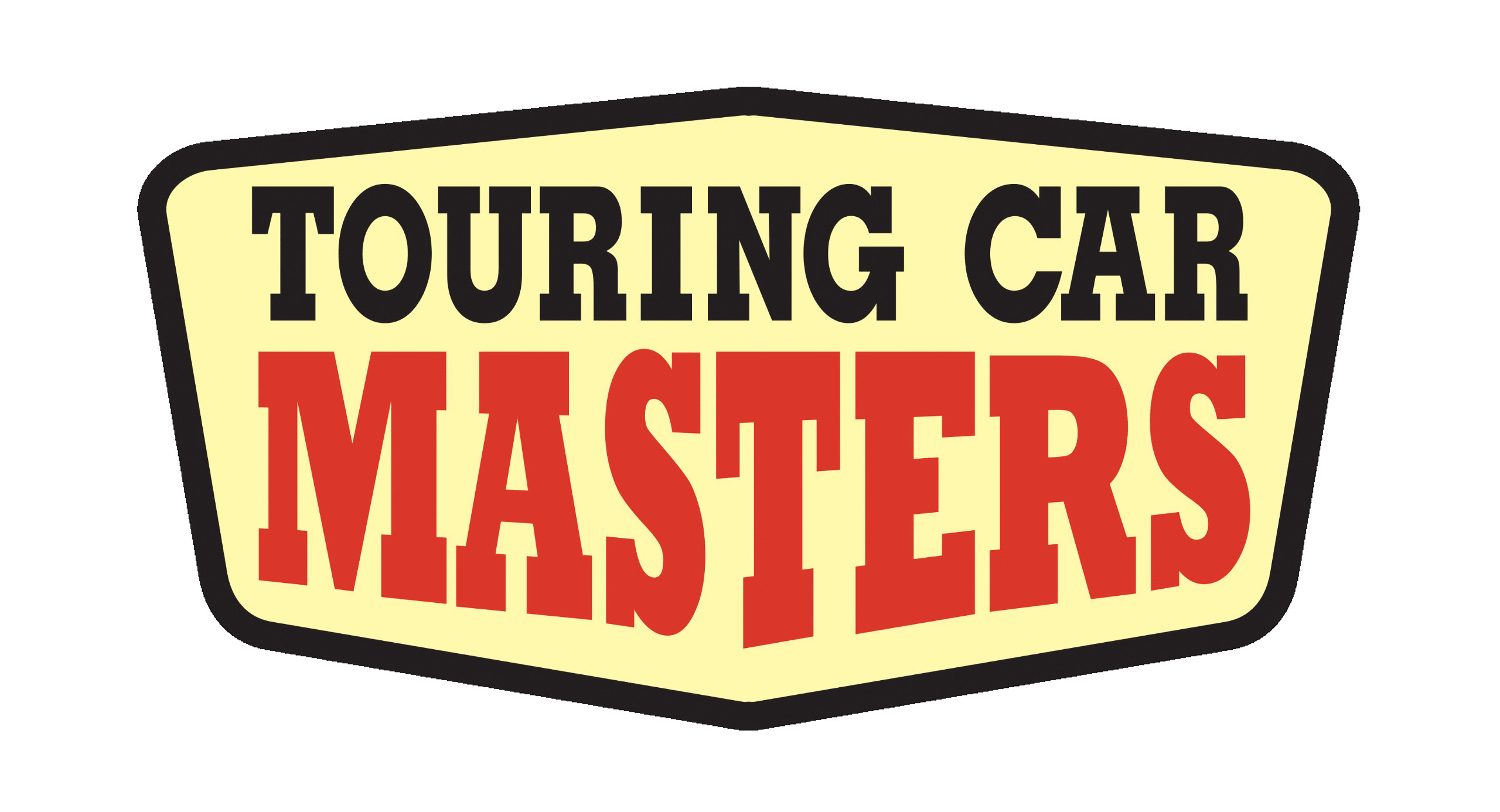
- Category: Touring Car Racing
- Country: Australia
- Inaugural season: 2007
- Drivers: 51
- Teams: 46
- Constructors: (United States) Chevrolet (Australia) Chrysler (United States) / (Australia) Ford/Ford (Australia) Holden (United States) Pontiac
- Tyre suppliers: Hoosier Tires
- Drivers' champion: Outright: Joel Heinrich; Pro-Masters: Joel Heinrich; Pro-Am: Danny Buzadzic; Pro-Sports: Jeremy Hassell
- Official website: touringcarmasters.com.au

Touring Car Masters is an Australian motor racing series open to modified touring cars manufactured between 1 January 1963 and 31 December 1980. It evolved out of a previous series for CAMS Group N Touring Cars but with a greater degree of modifications permitted to improve safety, reliability and affordability. These improvements would have been against the spirit of Group N regulations which are focused on vehicles racing as much as possible as they did in the period when the cars were new.

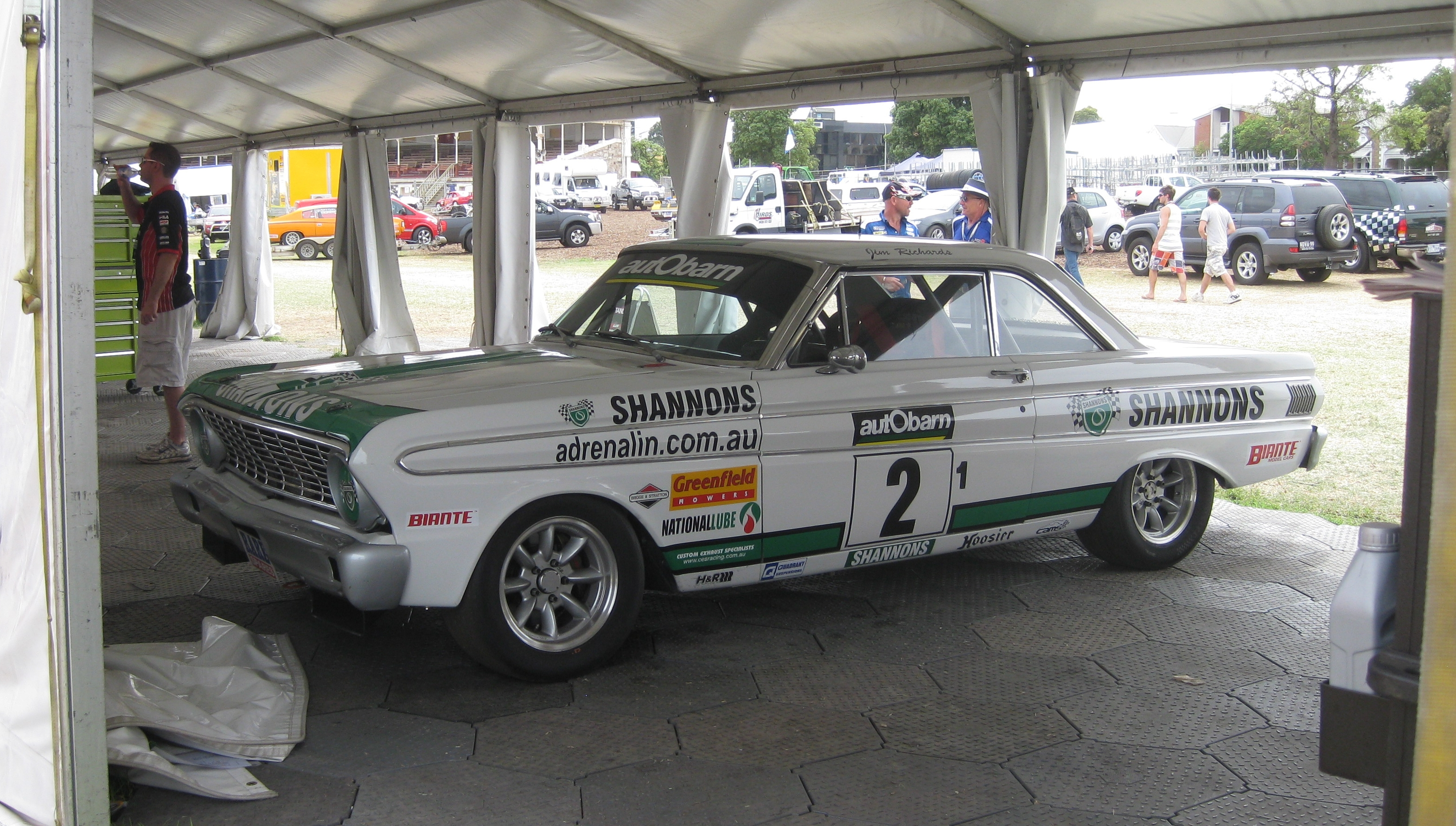
The 1964 Ford Falcon Sprint of 2010 Touring Car Masters Group 1 winner, Jim Richards

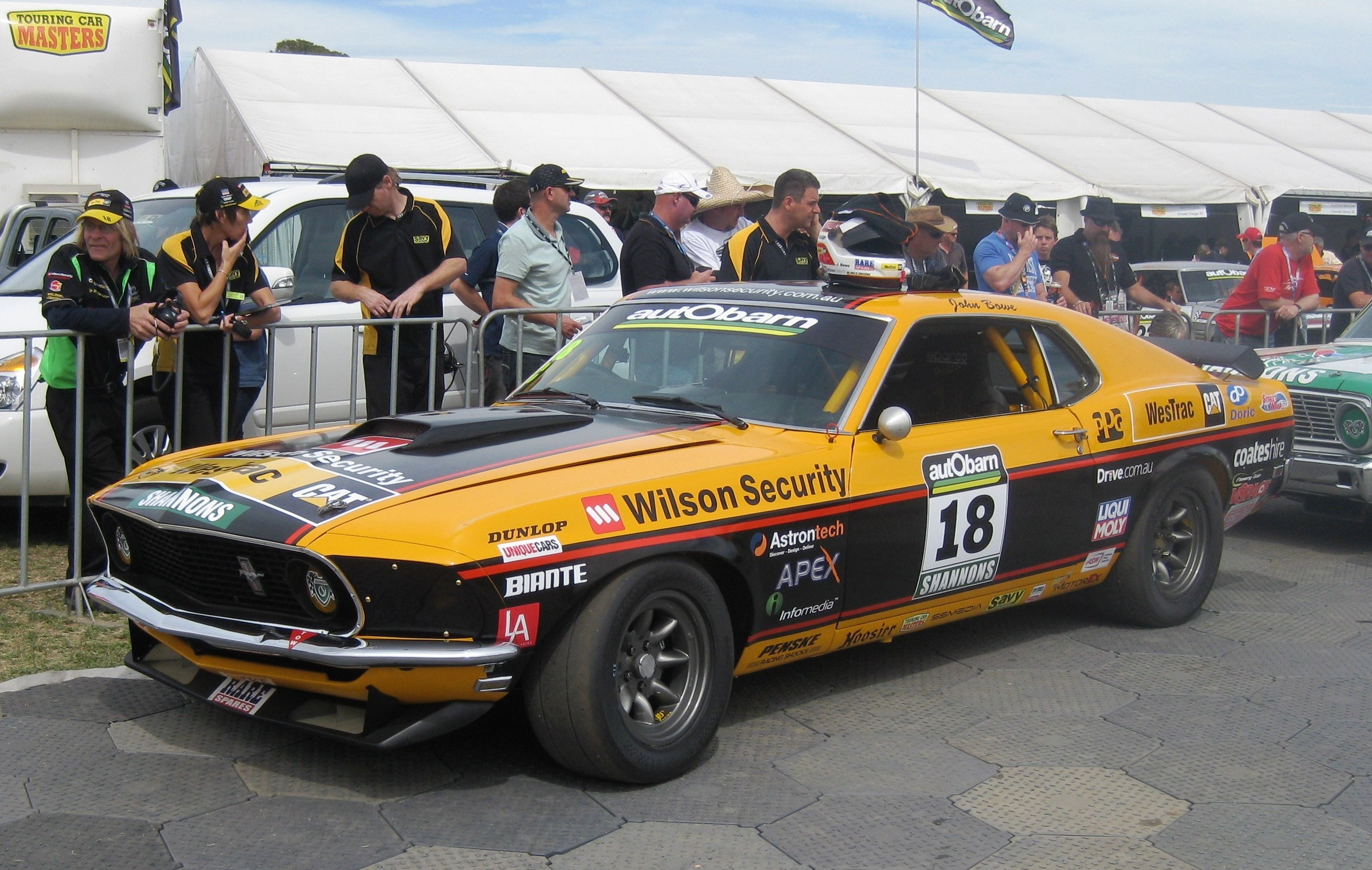
John Bowe won Class C in the 2011 series in a Ford Mustang

The series has proved popular with fans for the nostalgia value and also for the mix of eligible vehicles with the majority of competing vehicles being Australian or American V8s. Each model is allocated into one of three classes by the appointed category managers, TCM Racing Pty. Ltd, with drivers competing for Outright and Class awards. Performance parity is maintained between disparate models by varying maximum engine revolutions and minimum racing weights of those vehicles. In addition, a driver may be classified as a seeded driver and additional parity adjustments applied to cars driven by these drivers, as deemed appropriate.

== Class winners ==
Year	Group 1		Group 2		Group 3							
Year	Driver	Car	Driver	Car	Driver	Car						
2007	Steve Mason	1969 Chevrolet Camaro	Mick Wilson	1972 Chrysler Valiant Charger R/T	Not contested							
2008	Gavin Bullas	1969 Ford Boss Mustang	Greg East	1972 Holden HQ Kingswood	Not contested							
2009	Gavin Bullas	1969 Ford Boss Mustang	Trevor Talbot	1972 Holden LJ Torana GTR XU-1	Not contested							
2010	Jim Richards	1964 Ford Falcon Sprint	Bernie Stack	1973 Porsche 911RS	Tony Karanfilovski	1968 Alfa Romeo GTAm						
Year	Class A		Class B		Class C							
2011	Amanda Sparks	1973 Porsche 911RS	Gary O'Brien	1972 Holden HQ Monaro GTS 4 Door	John Bowe	1969 Ford Mustang						
2012	John Bowe	1969 Ford Mustang	Chris Stillwell	1968 Ford Mustang	Not contested							
2013	Jim Richards	1964 Ford Falcon Sprint	Steve Mason	1966 Ford Mustang	Not contested							
Year	Pro-Masters		Pro-Am		Pro-Sports							
2014	John Bowe	1969 Ford Mustang	Mark King	Chevrolet Camaro	Sven Burchartz; Chris Stillwell	Ford Mustang						
Year	Pro-Masters		Pro-Am		Pro-Sports		Invitational		Trans-Am			
2015	John Bowe	Ford Mustang; Holden LH Torana SL/R5000	Cameron Tilley	Chrysler VF Valiant Pacer	Leo Tobin	Holden HQ Monaro GTS	Paul Freestone	Chevrolet Camaro SS	Charlie O'Brien	Pontiac Firebird		
Year	Pro-Masters		Pro-Am		Pro-Sports		Invitational		Trans-Am			
2016	John Bowe	Holden LH Torana SL/R5000	Jason Gomersall	Holden LH Torana SL/R5000	Adam Garwood	Holden LH Torana SL/R5000; Ford Capri Perana	Greg Garwood	Ford Capri Perana	Not contested			
Year	Pro-Masters		Pro-Am		Pro-Sports		IROC		Invitational		Trans-Am	
2017	Steven Johnson	1969 Ford Mustang Fastback	Adam Bressington	1969 Chevrolet Camaro SS	Darren Beale	1972 Holden Monaro GTS Coupe	Rohan Little	1974 Porsche 911 IROC	Greg Garwood	Ford Capri Perana	Shannon O’Brien	Pontiac Firebird Trans Am
Year	Outright		Pro-Masters		Pro-Am		Pro-Sports					
2018	Steve Johnson	Ford Mustang	Steve Johnson	Ford Mustang	Cameron Tilley	Chrysler Valiant Pacer	Jim Pollicina	Holden Torana A9X				
2019	Steve Johnson	Ford Mustang	Steve Johnson	Ford Mustang	Jim Pollicina	Holden Torana A9X	Allen Boughen	Mercury Comet				
2020	Adam Bressington	Chevrolet Camaro SS	Adam Bressington	Chevrolet Camaro SS	Ryan Hansford	Holden Torana A9X	Peter Burnitt	Holden Torana A9X				
2021	John Bowe	Holden LH Torana SL/R5000	John Bowe	Holden LH Torana SL/R5000	Ryan Hansford	Holden Torana A9X	Peter Burnitt	Holden Torana A9X				
2022	Ryan Hansford	Holden Torana A9X	Ryan Hansford	Holden Torana A9X	Andrew Fisher	Ford Falcon GTHO	Warren Trewin	Holden Monaro GTS350				
2023	Steve Johnson	Ford Mustang	Steve Johnson	Ford Mustang	Cameron Tilley	Chrysler Valiant Pacer	Peter Burnitt	Holden Torana A9X				
2024	Adam Garwood	Holden VK Commodore	Joel Heinrich	Chevrolet Camaro SS	Adam Garwood	Holden VK Commodore						
2025	Joel Heinrich	Chevrolet Camaro SS	Joel Heinrich	Chevrolet Camaro SS	Danny Buzadzic	Holden Torana A9X	Jeremy Hassell	Holden Torana A9X				

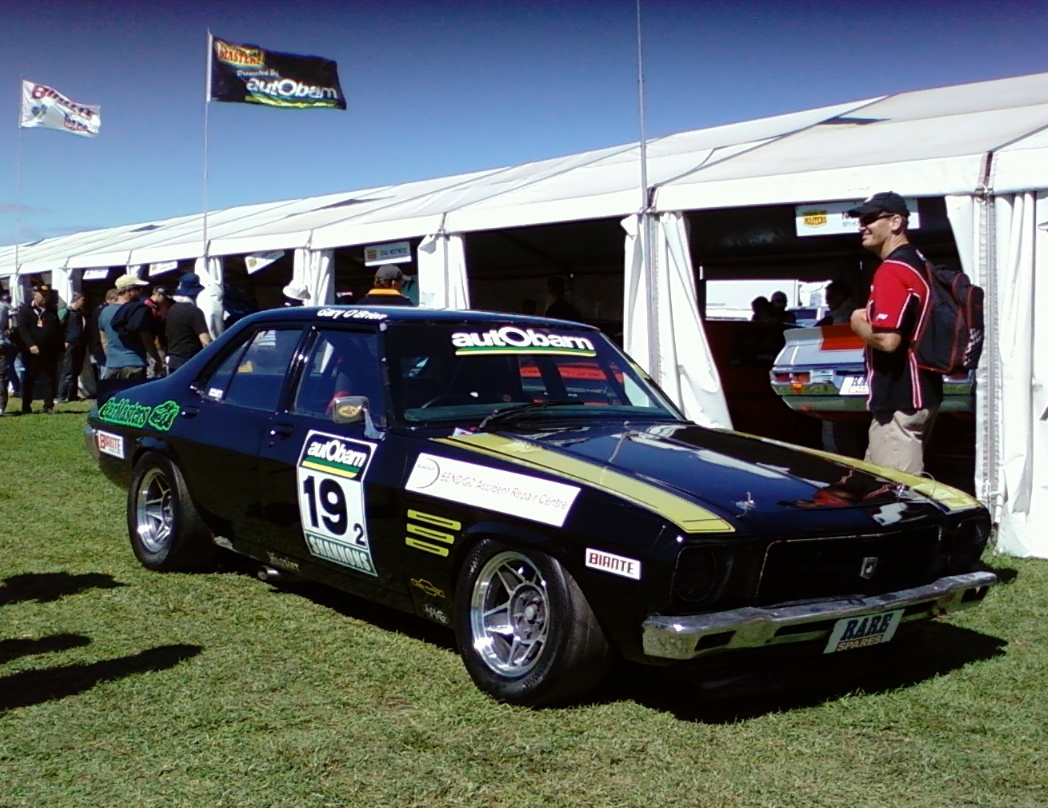
The 1972 Holden HQ SS of Gary O'Brien at the opening round of the 2010 series

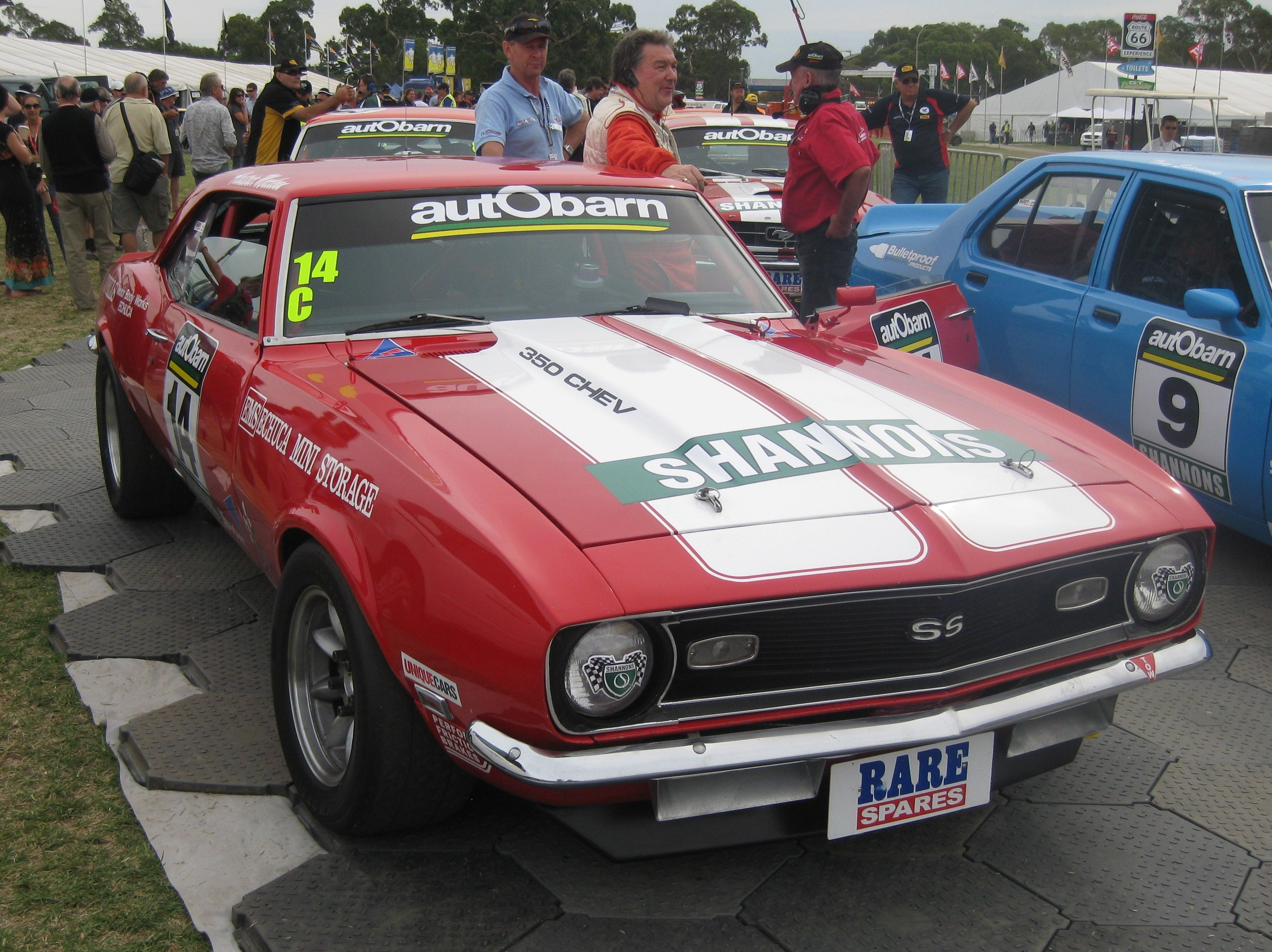
The 1968 Chevrolet Camaro SS of Alastair MacLean at the opening round of the 2011 series

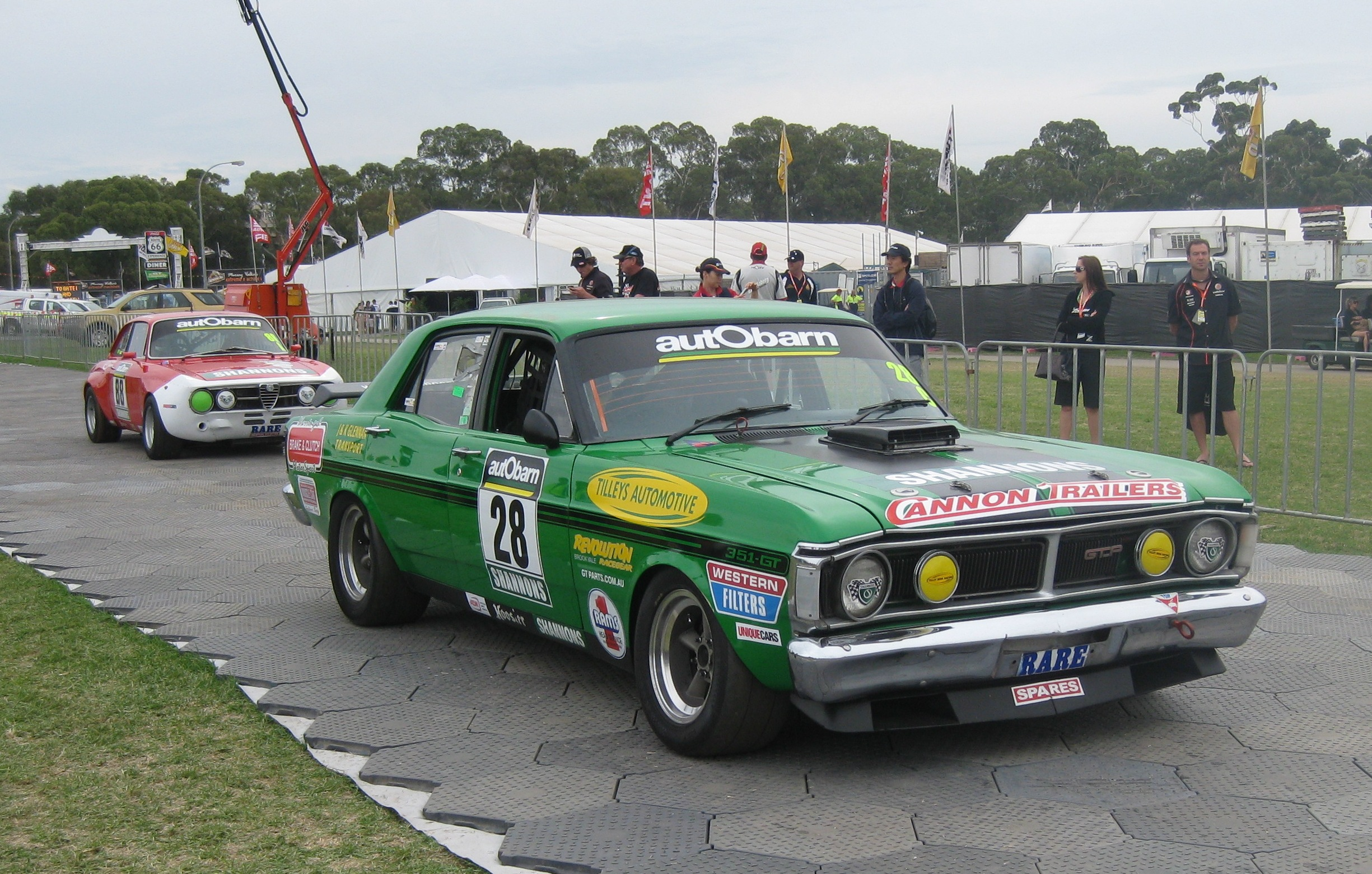
The Ford XY Falcon GTHO of Brad Tilley at the opening round of the 2011 series

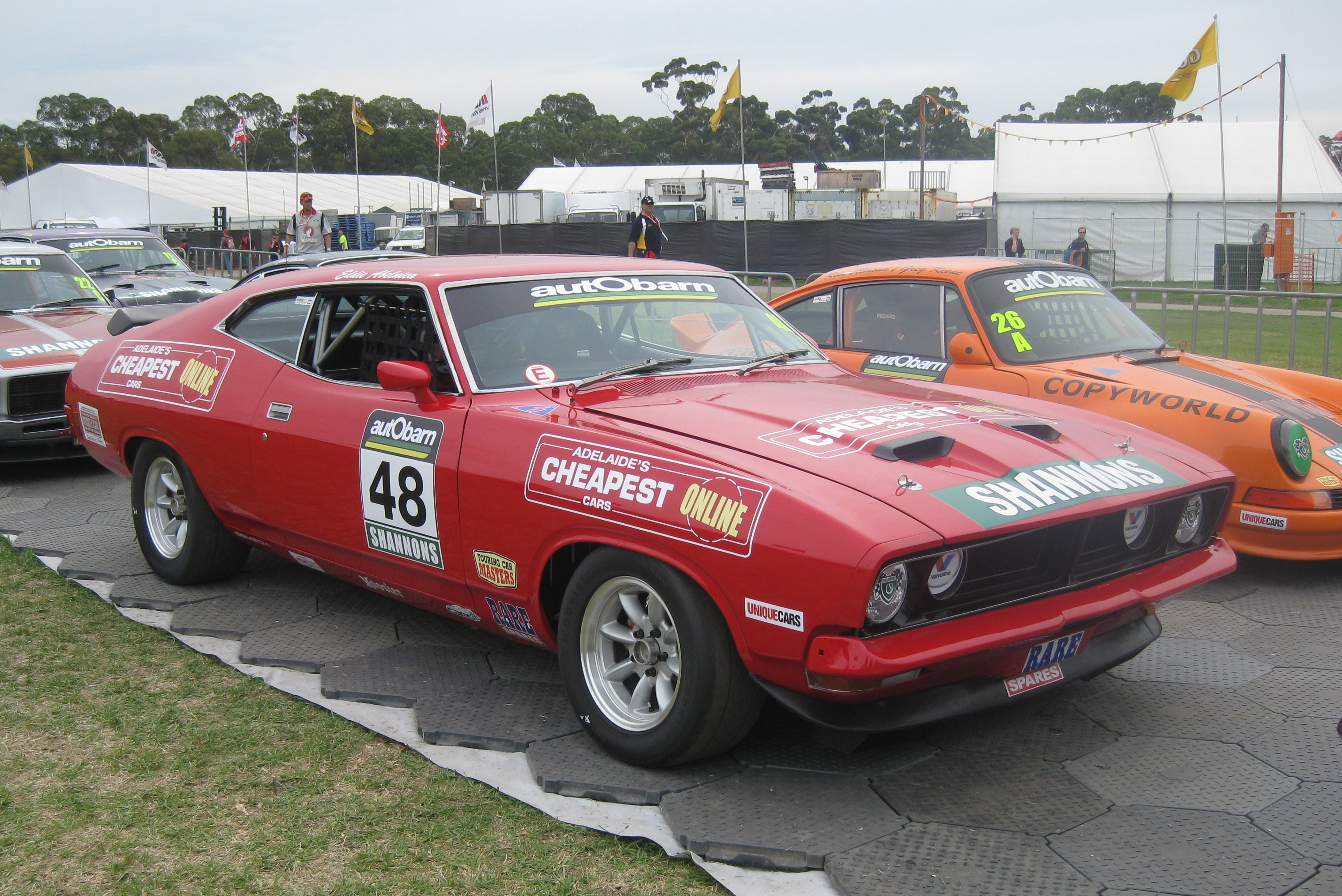
The Ford XB Falcon GT Hardtop of Eddie Abelnica at the opening round of the 2011 series

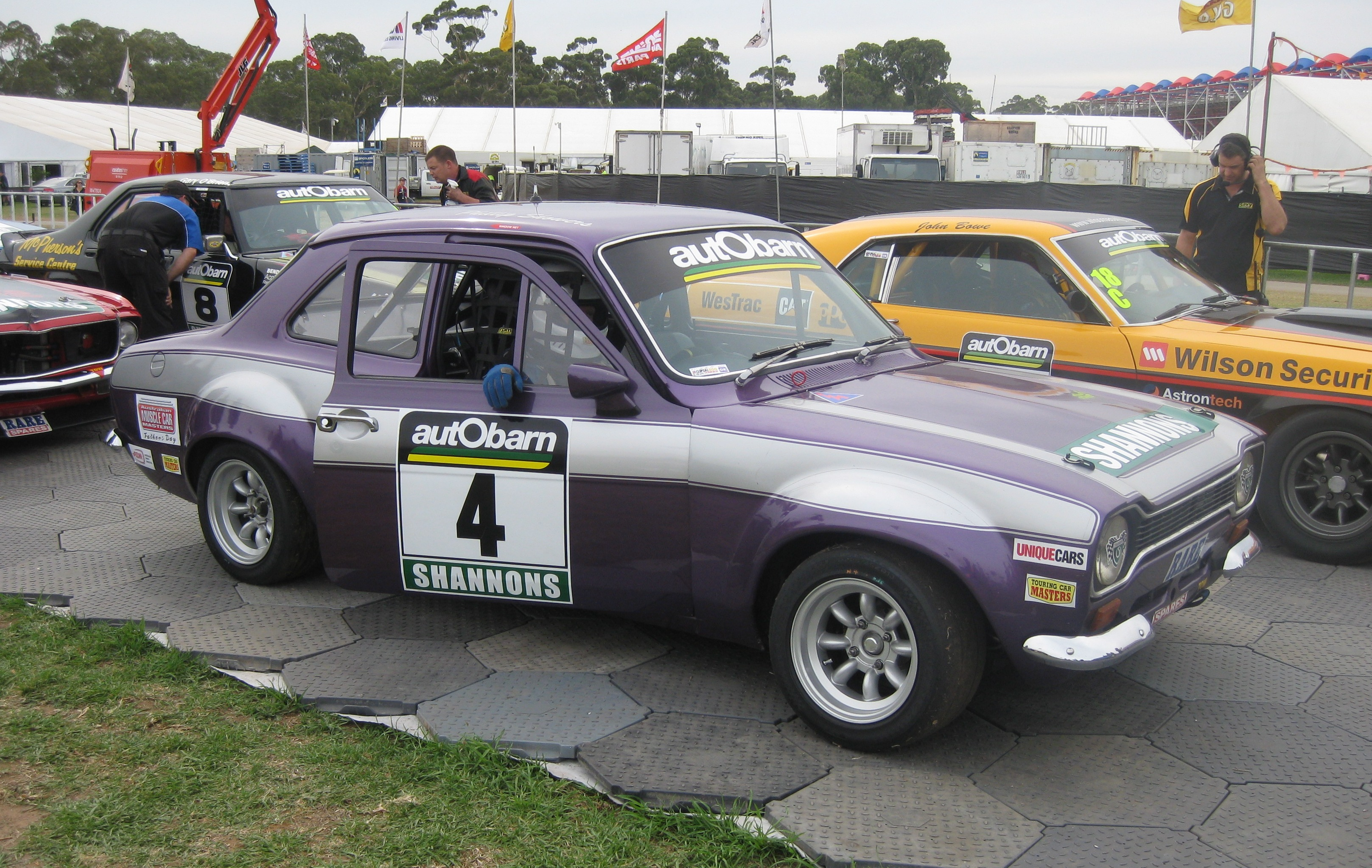
The Ford Escort RS1600 of Phillip Showers at the opening round of the 2011 series

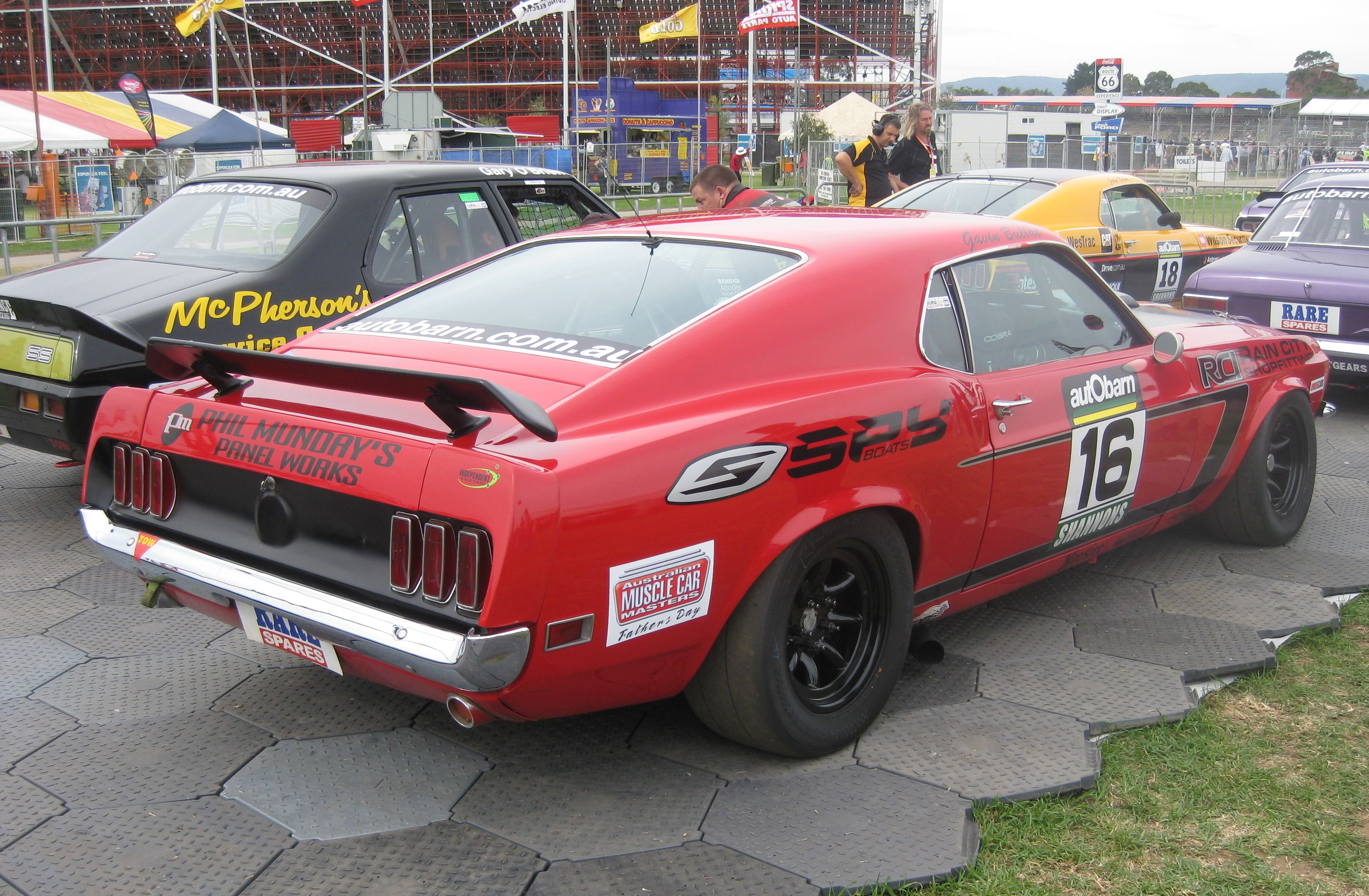
The 1969 Ford Mustang of Gavin Bullas at the opening round of the 2011 series

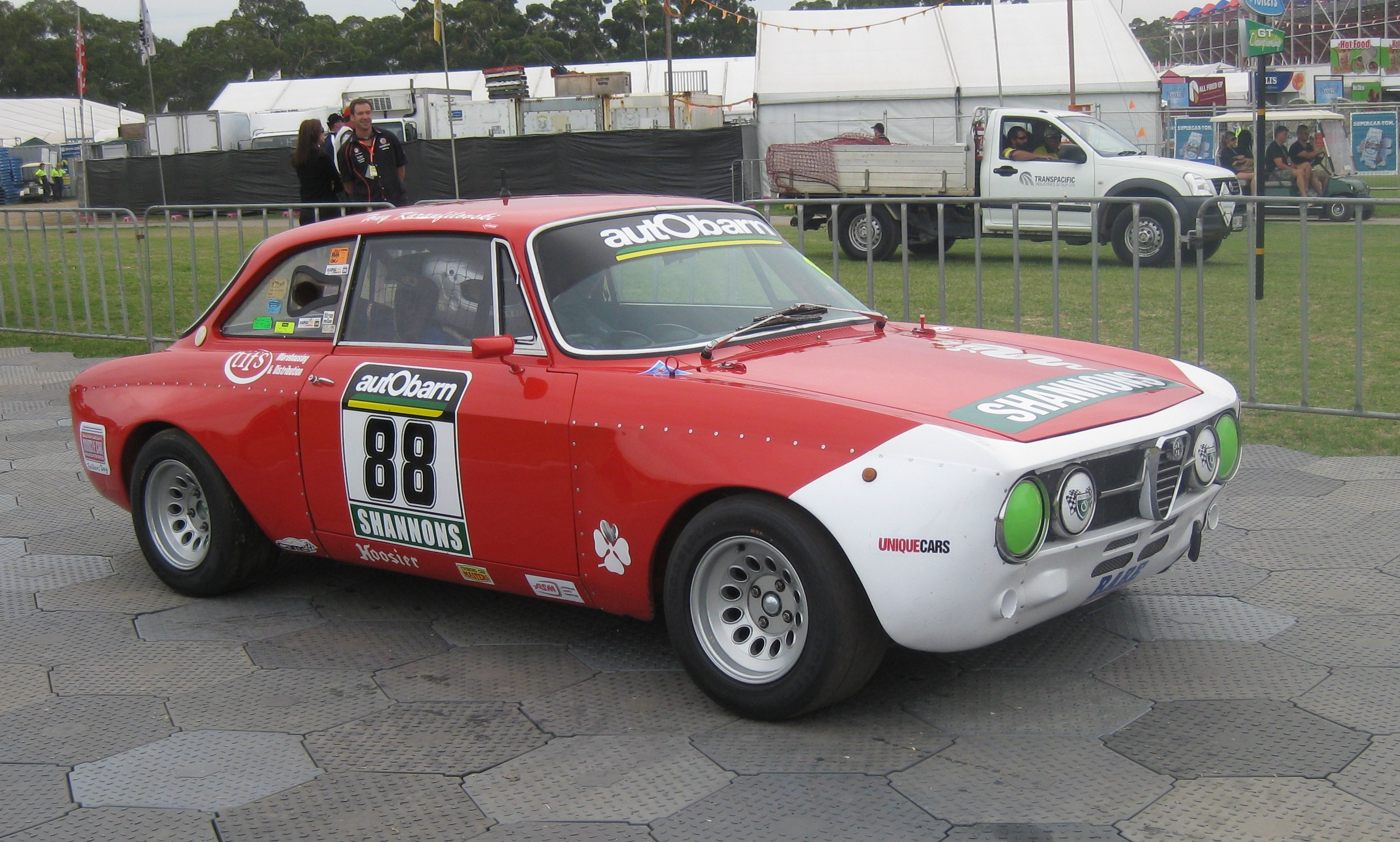
The Alfa Romeo GTAm of Tony Karanfilovski at the opening round of the 2011 series

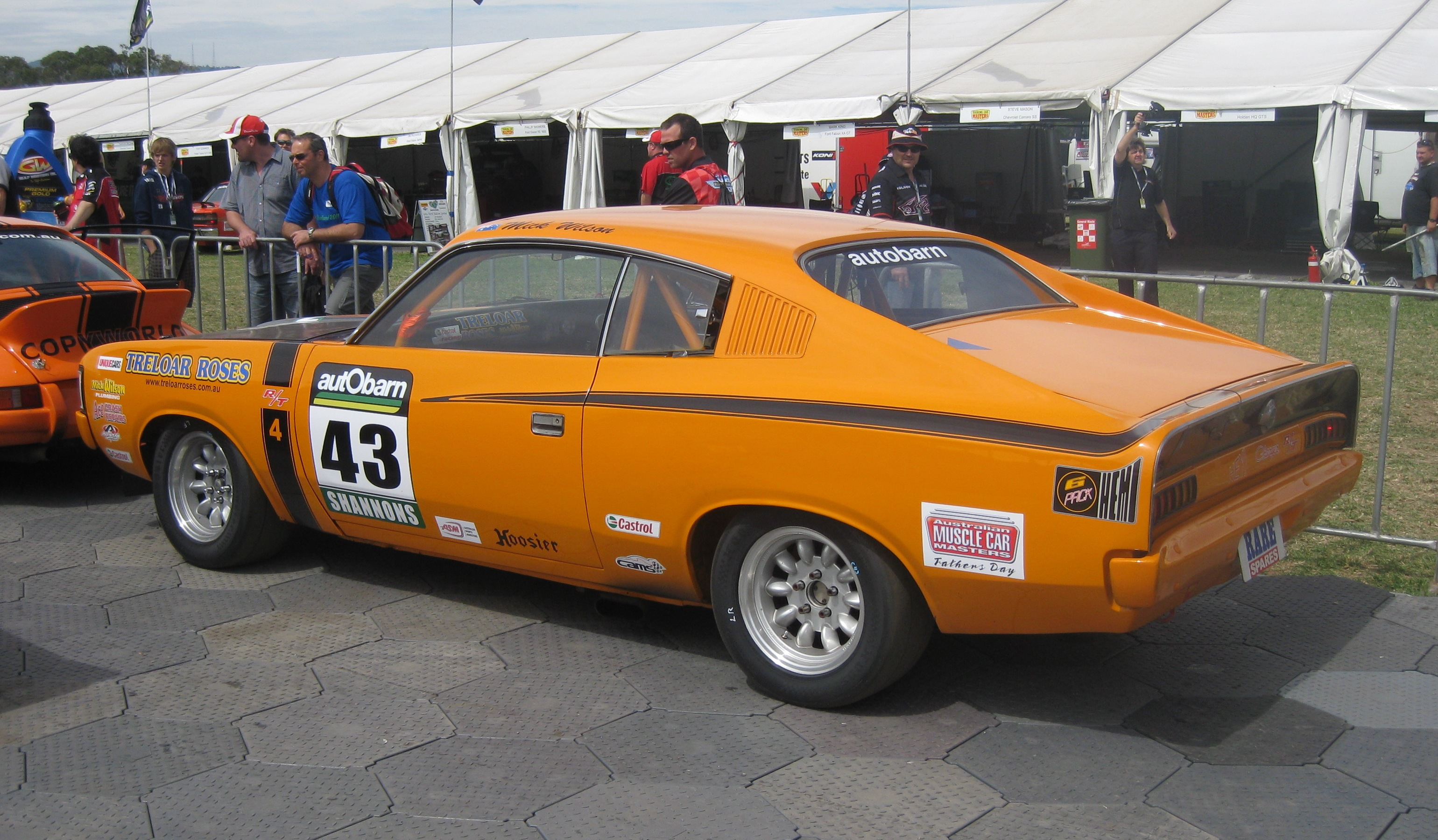
The Chrysler VH Valiant Charger R/T of Mick Wilson at the opening round of the 2011 series
