= 2009 Biante Touring Car Masters =

Australian motor racing series

2009 Touring Car Masters

Seasons
- ← 2008 2010 →

The 2009 Biante Touring Car Masters was an Australian motor racing series for pre-1974 Touring Cars. It was the third annual Touring Car Masters series.

Group 1 was won by Gavin Bullas driving a Ford Mustang and Group 2 by Trevor Talbot driving a Holden LJ Torana GTR XU-1.

== Schedule ==
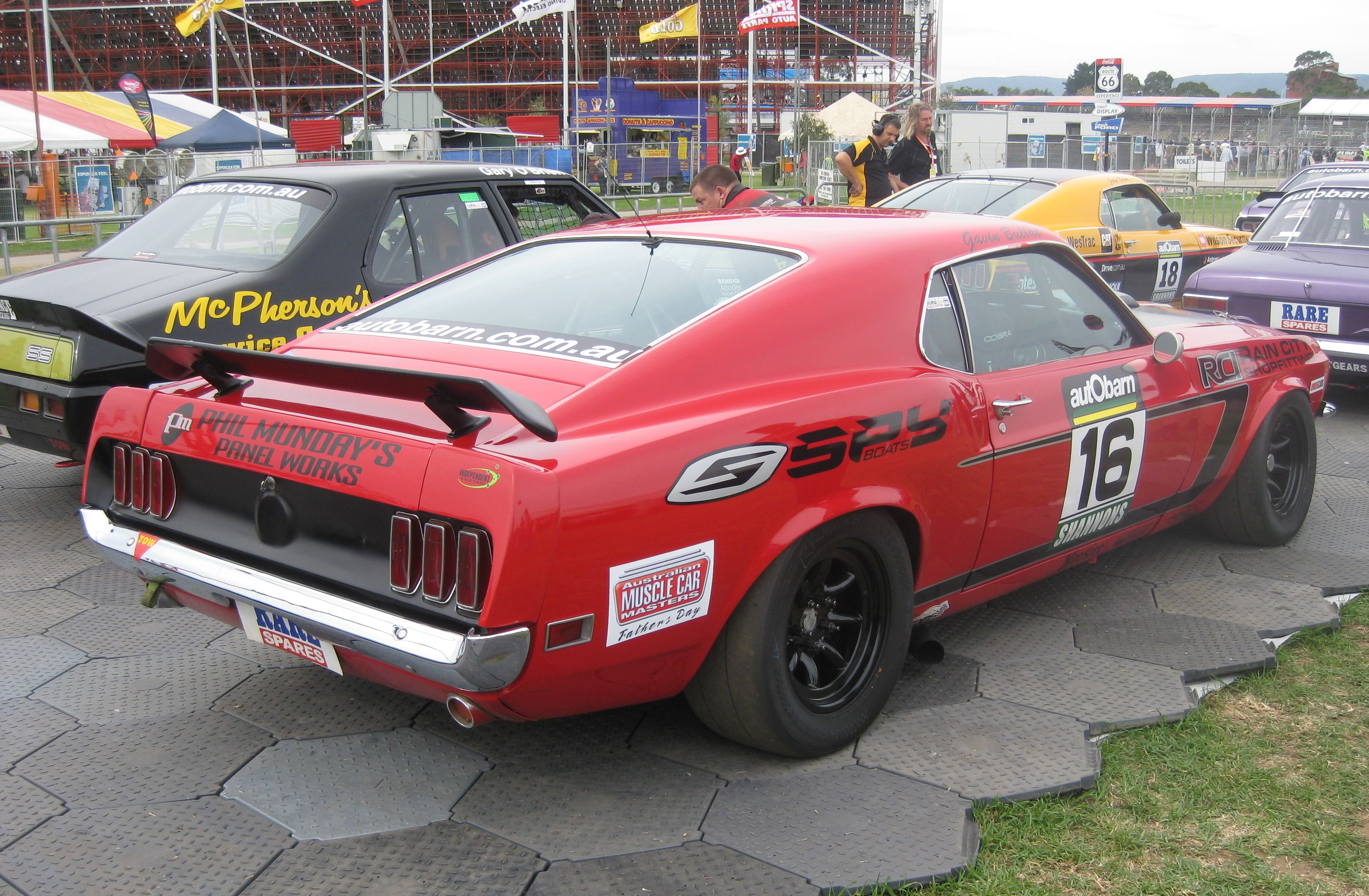
Gavin Bullas won Group 1 driving a Ford Mustang (pictured in 2011)

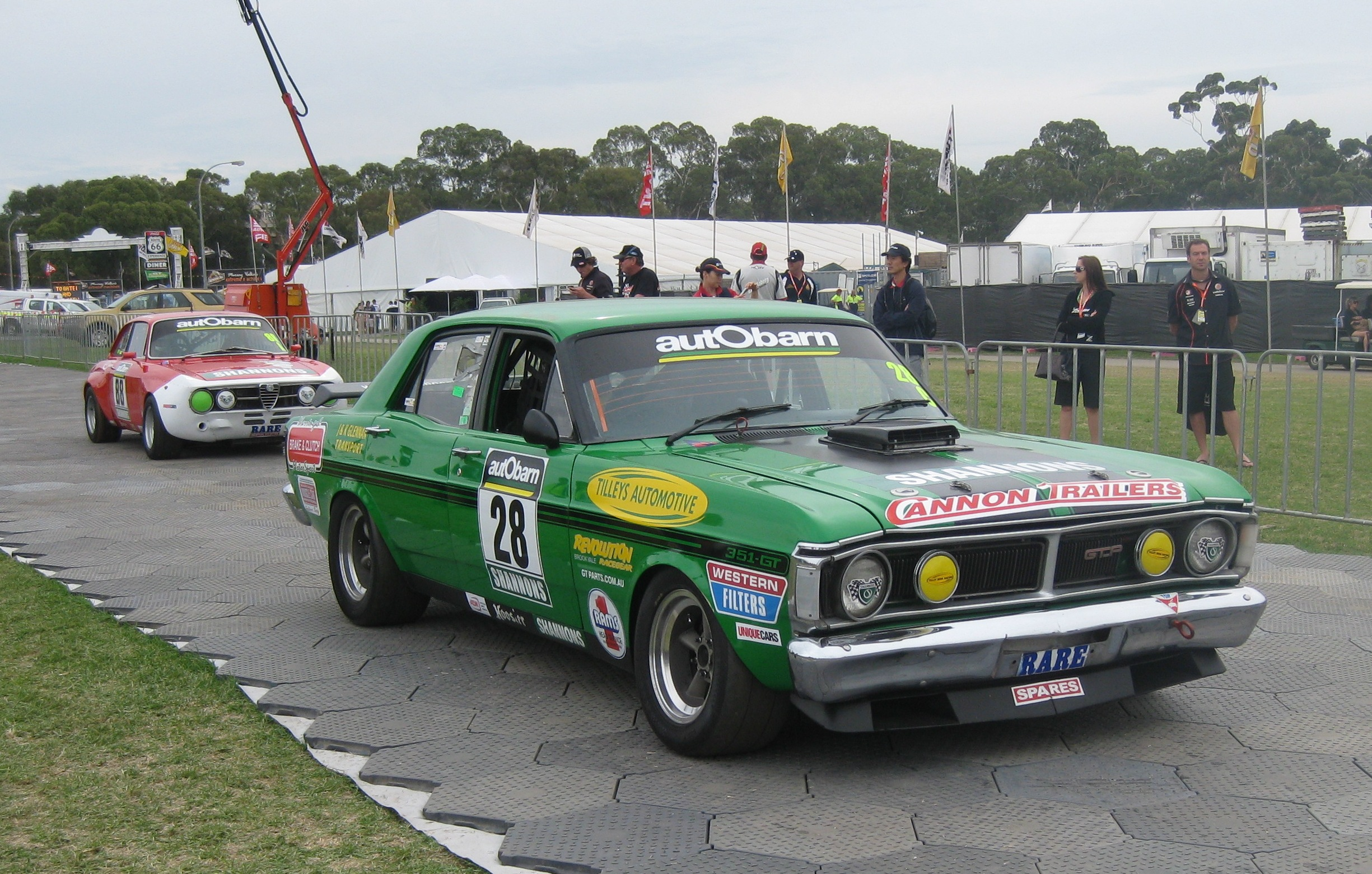
Brad Tilley placed second in Group 1 driving a Ford XY Falcon GT (pictured in 2011)

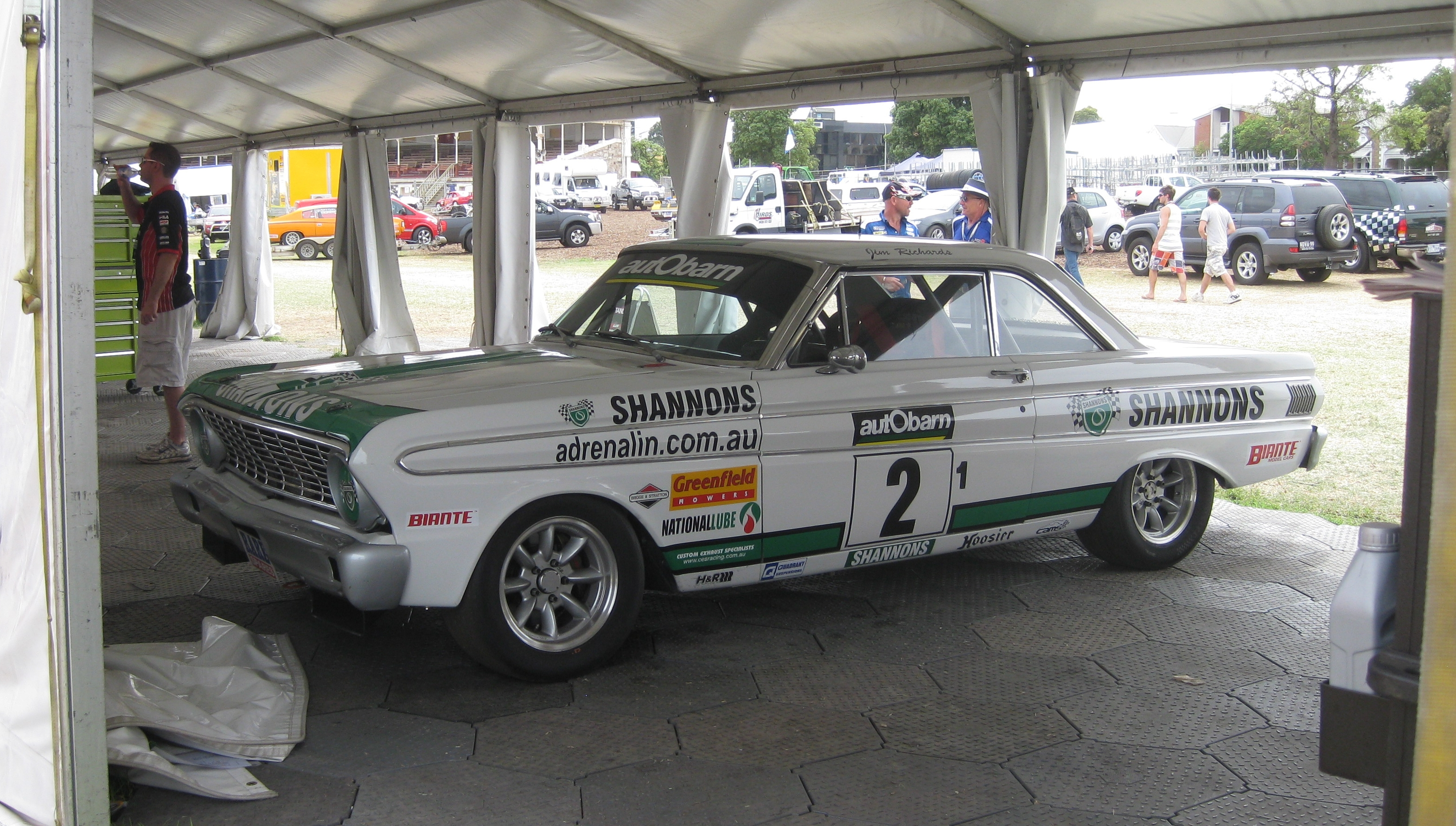
Jim Richards placed fourth in Group 1 driving a Ford Falcon Sprint (pictured in 2010)

The series was contested over seven rounds.

Round	Circuit	Date	Round winner	Car
1	Adelaide Parklands Circuit	1–4 March	Gavin Bullas	Ford Mustang
2	Winton Motor Raceway	1–3 May	Gavin Bullas	Ford Mustang
3	Hidden Valley Raceway	19–21 June	Gavin Bullas	Ford Mustang
4	Queensland Raceway, Ipswich	21–23 August	Jim Richards	Ford Falcon Sprint
5	Eastern Creek International Raceway	5–6 September	Gavin Bullas	Ford Mustang
6	Mount Panorama, Bathurst	8–11 October	Jim Richards	Ford Falcon Sprint
7	Sandown International Motor Raceway	7–8 November	Gavin Bullas	Ford Mustang

== Series standings ==
Group 1										
Position	Driver	Car	Ade	Win	Hid	Que	Eas	Bat	San	Total
1	Gavin Bullas	Ford Boss Mustang	180	168	180	164	168	153	168	1181
2	Brad Tilley	Ford XY Falcon GT	82	104	164	138	156	164	142	950
3	John Bowe	Chevrolet Camaro SS & Holden HQ Monaro	108	165	147	168	153	135	-	876
4	Jim Richards	Ford Falcon Sprint	52	-	135	172	155	168	161	843
5	Drew Marget	Ford Mustang	129	147	97	135	-	132	164	804
6	Steve Mason	Chevrolet Camaro SS	160	97	48	102	145	129	78	759
7	Rod Wilson	Ford XY Falcon GTHO	135	90	117	105	-	90	66	603
8	Tony Edwards	Holden HQ Monaro	36	129	90	132	42	-	148	577
9	Graham Alexander	Holden HQ Monaro	0	-	105	114	108	93	111	531
10	Tony Hunter	Holden HQ Monaro	123	-	-	87	123	60	78	471
11	Michael Acheson	Chrysler Valiant Charger E55	-	63	66	66	111	75	66	447
12	Bob Middleton	Chevrolet Camaro SS	60	69	111	81	57	45	0	423
13	Alastair MacLean	Chevrolet Camaro SS	45	120	0	-	-	134	-	299
14	Nigel Benson	Holden HQ Monaro	99	30	-	65	102	-	-	296
15	Steve Makarios	Ford XY Falcon GTHO	102	96	30	-	-	-	0	228
16	Matt O'Brien	Holden HQ Monaro	-	-	-	45	0	105	-	150
17	Garry Treloar	Chevrolet Camaro SS	-	-	-	18	-	-	108	126
18	Ross Donnelley	Ford Boss Mustang	-	99	-	-	-	-	-	99
19	Mike Erwin	Ford XY Falcon GT	66	-	-	-	-	-	-	66
20	Brett Youlden	Ford XY Falcon GTHO	-	48	-	-	-	-	-	48
21	Cameron Tilley	Ford XY Falcon GT	-	-	0	-	-	-	-	0
Group 2										
Position	Driver	Car	Ade	Win	Hid	Que	Eas	Bat	San	Total
1	Trevor Talbot	Holden LJ Torana GTR XU-1	156	156	148	-	160	160	148	928
2	Rory O'Neill	Porsche 911 RS	135	136	87	152	98	117	117	842
3	Greg Waddington	Holden Monaro & Holden HQ SS	153	-	104	112	100	153	168	790
4	John Nelson	Porsche 911 RS	176	0	152	52	126	84	129	719
5	Bernie Stack	Porsche 911 RS	-	141	180	-	0	116	120	557
6	Graeme Cook	Porsche 911 RS	112	160	33	176	0	-	0	481
7	Ian McAlister	Ford Mustang	-	129	75	-	123	39	105	471
8	Mick Wilson	Chrysler Valiant Charger R/T	48	-	145	-	45	145	81	464
9	Cameron Tilley	Chrysler Valiant Pacer	-	-	-	-	120	164	97	381
10	Cameron Mason	Datsun 510	66	111	42	0	117	30	-	366
11	Phillip Showers	Ford Escort RS1600	-	117	-	84	33	0	90	324
12	Greg Keene	Porsche 911 RS	-	-	126	-	164	27	-	317
13	Mark Forgie	Porsche 911 RS	114	-	-	149	-	-	-	263
14	Greg East	Holden HQ Monaro	72	172	-	-	-	-	-	244
15	Amanda Sparks	Porsche 911 RS	-	36	-	139	-	-	33	208
16	Richard Fairlam	Holden HQ Monaro	123	42	0	-	42	0		207
17	Tony Karanfilovski	Alfa Romeo GTAm	-	0	0	0	0	114	66	180
18	Chris Stillwell	Ford Mustang	-	-	-	-	-	-	157	157
19	Garry Treloar	Chrysler Valiant Charger R/T	39	-	-	-	-	-	-	39
20	Mark Buik	Porsche 911 RS	-	-	-	-	-	0	-	0
