= 2012 Australian Touring Car Masters Series =

Australian motor racing competition

2012 Touring Car Masters

Seasons
- ← 2011 2013 →

The 2012 Australian Touring Car Masters Series was an Australian motor racing competition for modified Touring Cars. The series was open to cars manufactured between 1 January 1963 and 31 December 1973 and to specific models manufactured between 1 January 1974 and 31 December 1976. It was sanctioned by the Confederation of Australian Motor Sport (CAMS) as a National Series with Australian Classic Touring (3D) Cars Pty Ltd appointed by CAMS as the Category Manager. The series was the sixth annual Touring Car Masters.

John Bowe (Ford Mustang) won Class A - Outright and Chris Stillwell (Ford Mustang) won Class B - Pro Sportsman.

== Calendar ==
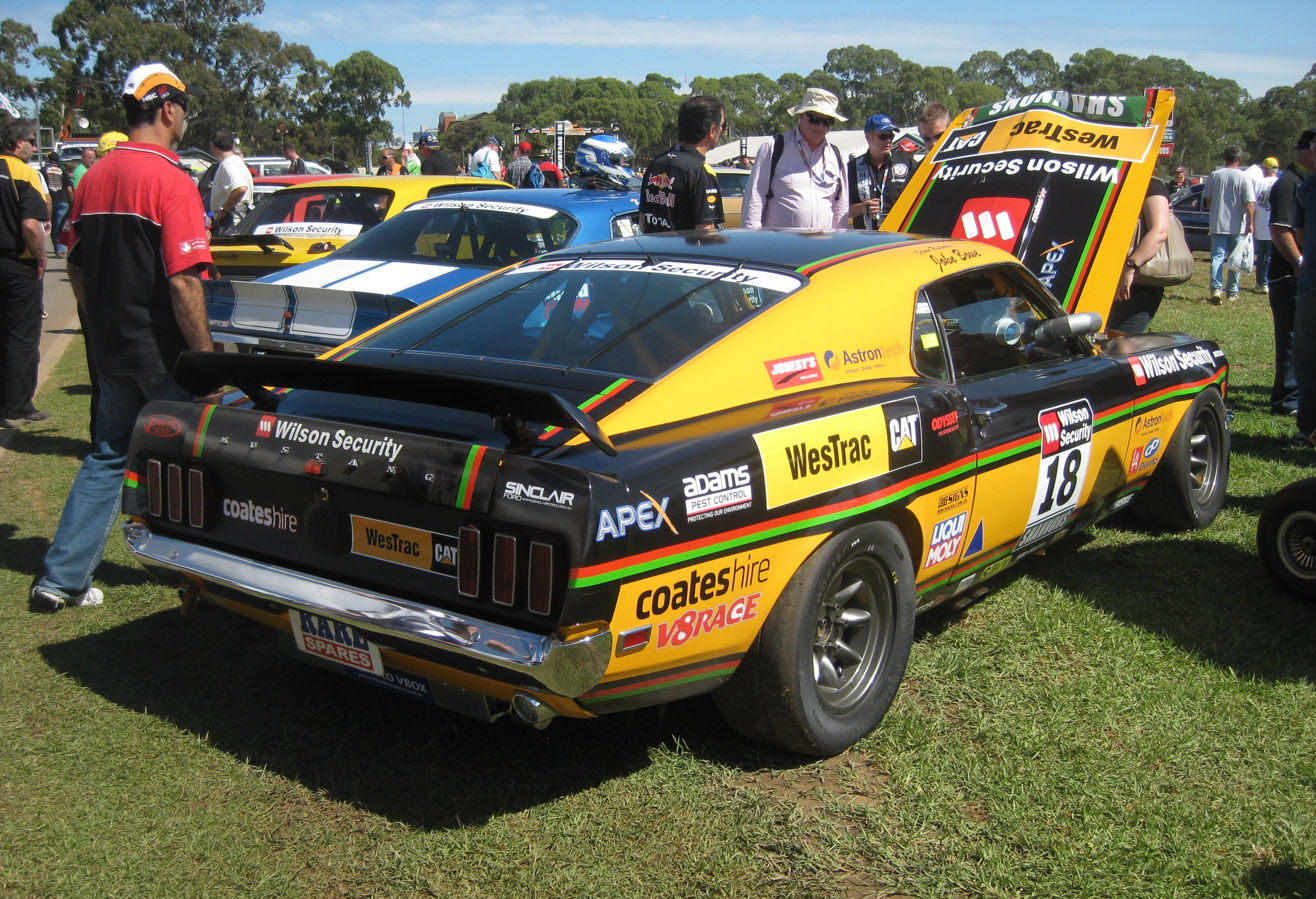
John Bowe won Class A driving a Ford Mustang

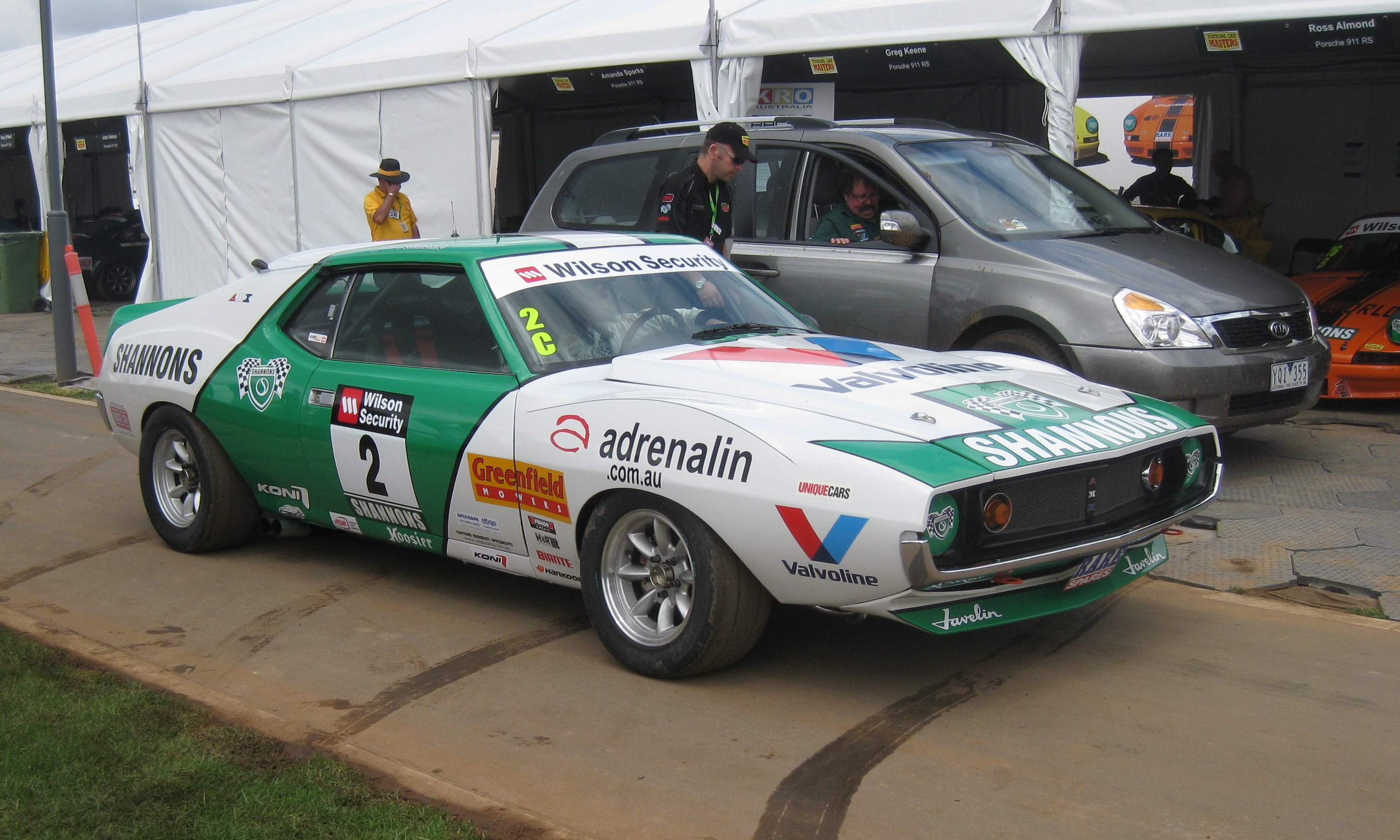
Jim Richards placed second in Class A driving an AMC Javelin

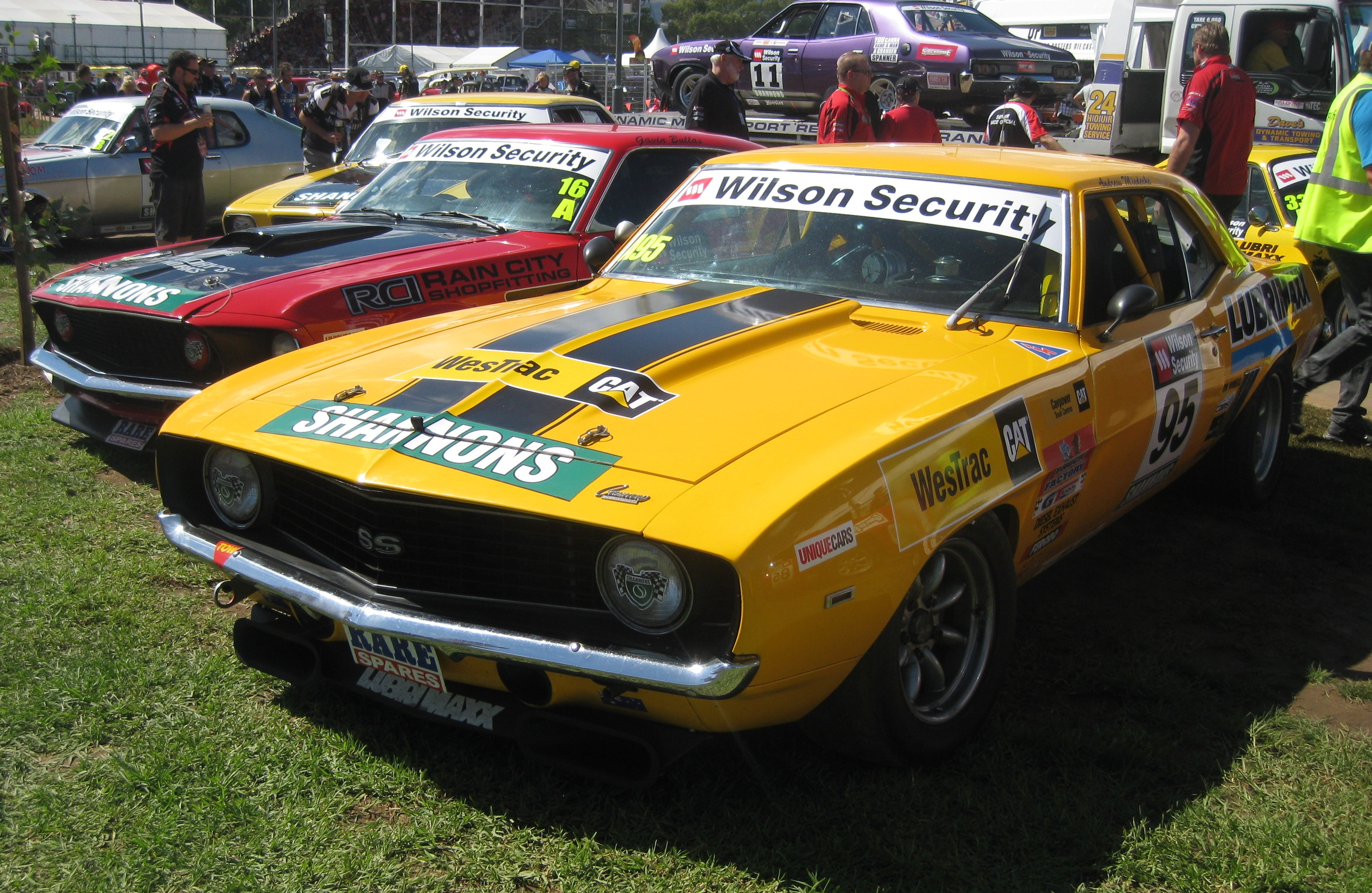
Andrew Miedecke placed third in Class A driving a Chevrolet Camaro SS

The series was contested over eight rounds.

| Round | Circuit | Date | Format | Round winner (Outright) | Car |
| 1 | Adelaide Parklands | 4 March | Three races | John Bowe | Ford Mustang |
| 2 | Phillip Island | 27 May | Three races | Gavin Bullas | Ford Boss Mustang |
| 3 | Hidden Valley | 17 June | Three races | John Bowe | Ford Mustang |
| 4 | Queensland Raceway | 5 August | Three races | John Bowe | Ford Mustang |
| 5 | Sydney Motorsport Park | 2 September | Three races | John Bowe | Ford Mustang |
| 6 | Sandown | 16 September | Three races | Jim Richards | AMC Javelin |
| 7 | Mount Panorama | 7 October | Three races | Brad Tilley | Ford XY Falcon GTHO |
| 8 | Sandown | 25 November | Three races | John Bowe | Ford Mustang |

Note: The results for each round of the Series were determined by the number of points scored by each driver in each Class at the round.

== Classes & points system ==
Each competing car was classified into one of two classes.

Series points were awarded on the following basis within each class at each race.

| Position | 1st | 2nd | 3rd | 4th | 5th | 6th | 7th | 8th | 9th | 10th | 11th | 12th | 13th | 14th | 15th | 16th | 17th | 18th | 19th | 20th | 21st | 22nd | 23rd | 24th | 25th | 26th | 27th | 28th | 29th | 30th |
|---|---|---|---|---|---|---|---|---|---|---|---|---|---|---|---|---|---|---|---|---|---|---|---|---|---|---|---|---|---|---|
| Points | 60 | 56 | 52 | 48 | 45 | 42 | 39 | 36 | 33 | 30 | 27 | 24 | 21 | 18 | 17 | 16 | 15 | 14 | 13 | 12 | 11 | 10 | 9 | 8 | 7 | 6 | 5 | 4 | 3 | 2 |

The driver gaining the highest points total from his/her best seven round results was declared the winner of that class.

Any points scored by a driver within a class were not transferred if that driver changed classes.

== Series standings ==
=== Class A - Outright ===
| Position | Driver | Car | Ade | Phi | Hid | Que | Eas | San | Mou | San | Pen. | Total |
| 1 | John Bowe | Ford Mustang | 176 | (129) | 180 | 180 | 180 | 138 | 164 | 160 | -60 | 1118 |
| 2 | Jim Richards | AMC Javelin | 148 | 109 | 157 | 108 | 156 | 168 | 108 | (60) | | 954 |
| 3 | Andrew Miedecke | Chevrolet Camaro SS | 164 | 93 | 130 | 108 | 164 | 98 | 122 | (60) | -30 | 849 |
| 4 | Tony Edwards | Holden Torana SL/R | (0) | 150 | 152 | 126 | 117 | 132 | 99 | 39 | | 815 |
| 5 | Keith Kassulke | Holden HQ Monaro & Ford XB Falcon Hardtop | 111 | 120 | 139 | 138 | (99) | 111 | 123 | 105 | -39 | 808 |
| 6 | Bill Pye | Chevrolet Camaro SS | 135 | 75 | 78 | 111 | (66) | 117 | 99 | 142 | | 757 |
| 7 | Mark King | Holden HQ Monaro GTS & Chevrolet Camaro RS | 114 | 122 | 75 | 90 | 57 | 111 | 99 | (36) | -33 | 668 |
| 8 | Brett Youlden | Holden HQ Monaro | 105 | 153 | 105 | 90 | 90 | - | (81) | 105 | | 648 |
| 9 | Gavin Bullas | Ford Boss Mustang | 133 | 158 | (0) | - | - | 164 | 81 | - | -56 | 536 |
| 10 | Brad Tilley | Ford XY Falcon GT | - | - | 142 | - | (132) | - | 164 | 148 | | 454 |
| 11 | Eddie Abelnica | Ford XB Falcon Hardtop | 45 | 30 | - | 125 | 139 | - | 99 | (0) | | 438 |
| 12 | Greg Crick | Ford XY Falcon GTHO & Chrysler Valiant Charger E55 | - | - | - | 75 | (42) | 134 | 78 | 149 | | 436 |
| 13 | Chris Collins | Ford XA Falcon GT | - | 111 | - | - | 61 | (27) | 48 | 127 | | 347 |
| 14 | Adam Bressington | Chevrolet Camaro SS | - | - | - | - | 78 | 114 | 114 | (0) | | 306 |
| 15 | Tony Karanfilovski | Ford XY Falcon GTHO | 60 | (0) | 45 | 59 | 0 | 21 | 48 | 39 | | 272 |
| 16 | Les Walmsley | Ford XA Falcon GT | (63) | - | - | 142 | 120 | - | - | - | | 262 |
| 17 | George Nittis | Ford XY Falcon GTHO | 81 | 75 | 51 | (0) | - | - | - | 54 | | 261 |
| 18 | Michael Wedge | Holden HQ Monaro | - | - | - | 81 | 66 | (0) | 62 | - | | 209 |
| 19 | Steve Makarios | Ford XY Falcon GTHO | - | 42 | - | - | 17 | 33 | (0) | 90 | | 182 |
| 20 | Paul Freestone | Chevrolet Camaro SS | - | - | - | (0) | 35 | 54 | 0 | 81 | | 170 |
| 21 | Garry Treloar | Chrysler Valiant Charger E55 | - | 81 | 66 | - | (0) | - | 0 | 0 | | 147 |
| 22 | Doug Westwood | Ford XY Falcon GTHO | 39 | - | - | - | (24) | - | - | - | | 39 |
| 23 | Matt O'Brien | Holden HQ Monaro | - | 30 | - | (0) | 0 | - | - | - | | 30 |
| 24 | Graham Alexander | Holden HT Monaro | - | - | (63) | - | - | - | - | - | | 0 |
| 25 | Cameron Tilley | Ford Boss Mustang | - | - | - | - | - | - | (60) | - | | 0 |
| 26 | Bernie Stack | Chevrolet Camaro SS | (75) | - | - | - | - | - | - | - | | 0 |
| 27 | Glenn Seton | Ford XY Falcon GTHO | - | - | - | - | - | - | (0) | - | | 0 |

Note: Points shown within brackets in the above table could not be counted towards the drivers series total.

=== Class B - Pro Sportsman ===
| Position | Driver | Car | Ade | Phi | Hid | Que | Eas | San | Mou | San | Pen. | Total |
| 1 | Chris Stillwell | Ford Mustang | 164 | 168 | 157 | 180 | (112) | 168 | 164 | 156 | | 1157 |
| 2 | Nigel Benson | Holden HQ Monaro | 160 | 164 | 139 | 164 | (0) | 180 | 147 | 126 | | 1080 |
| 3 | Amanda Sparks | Porsche 911 RS | (66) | 139 | 157 | 126 | 152 | 142 | 123 | 111 | | 950 |
| 4 | Greg Keene | Porsche 911 RS | 102 | 132 | 134 | 145 | (60) | 100 | 142 | 149 | | 904 |
| 5 | Wayne Mercer | Ford XY Falcon GTHO | - | 117 | 102 | 120 | 139 | 132 | ('75) | 143 | | 753 |
| 6 | Michael Almond | Porsche 911 RS | - | - | (100) | 153 | 112 | 100 | 139 | 129 | | 633 |
| 7 | Steve Mason | Ford Mustang | - | (81) | 162 | 138 | - | - | 176 | 108 | | 584 |
| 8 | Gary O'Brien | Holden HQ Monaro GTS | 135 | - | - | - | - | - | (96) | 176 | | 311 |
| 9 | Rory O'Neill | Porsche 911 RS | 114 | (30) | 105 | - | - | - | - | 0 | | 249 |
| 10 | John Nelson | Porsche 911 RS | 138 | 108 | (45) | - | - | - | - | - | | 246 |
| 11 | Mick Wilson | Chrysler Valiant Charger R/T | 78 | (0) | 0 | - | - | - | 0 | 102 | | 180 |
| 12 | Tony Hunter | Holden HQ Monaro | 168 | (159) | - | - | - | - | - | - | | 168 |
| 13 | Bob Middleton | Chevrolet Camaro SS | - | 135 | (132) | - | - | - | - | - | | 135 |
| 13 | Cameron Mason | Ford Mustang | - | - | - | - | (105) | - | - | - | | 0 |
| 14 | Jason Gomersall | Holden Torana SL/R | - | - | - | - | (101) | - | - | - | | 0 |
| 16 | Ross Almond | Porsche 911 RS | (75) | - | - | - | - | - | - | - | | 0 |
| 17 | Phillip Showers | Ford Escort RS1600 | - | (0) | - | - | - | - | - | - | | 0 |

Note: Points shown within brackets in the above table could not be counted towards the drivers series total.
