= 2007 Biante Touring Car Masters =

Australian motor racing series

2007 Touring Car Masters

Seasons
- ← none 2008 →

The 2007 Biante Touring Car Masters was an Australian motor racing series for automobiles that were visual period replicas of models that competed in Australian Touring Car racing prior to 31 December 1973. Eligible cars were required to comply with Group 3D Sports Sedan regulations and with the additional provisions of the 2007 Touring Car Masters Technical Regulations.

The series, which was the inaugural Touring Car Masters, was won by Steve Mason driving a Chevrolet Camaro. Class B was won by Mick Wilson driving a Chrysler VH Valiant Charger R/T.

== Schedule ==
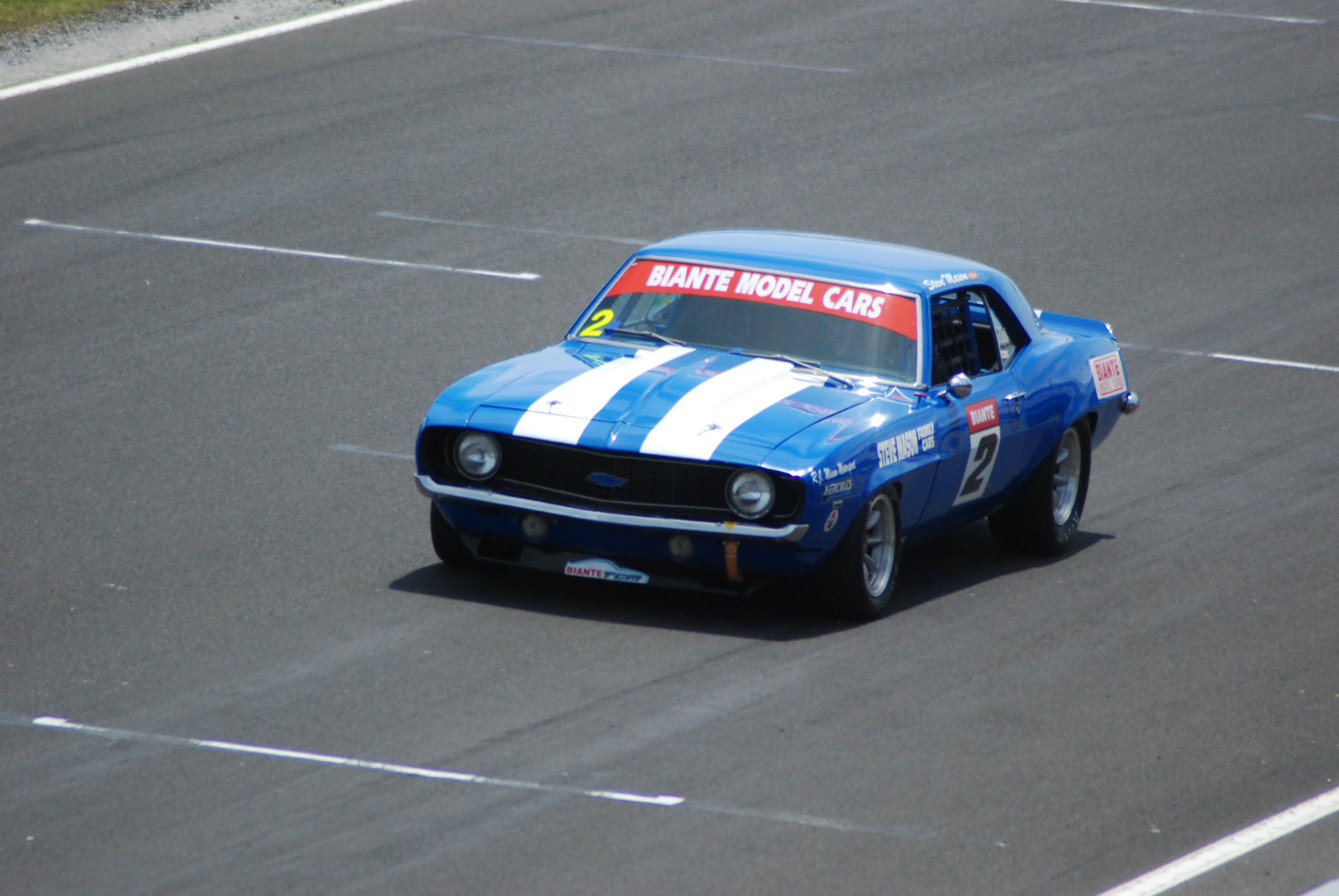
Steve Mason won the inaugural Touring Car Masters driving a Chevrolet Camaro

The series was contested over eight rounds with each round comprising three races:

Round	Circuit	Dates	Winning driver	Car
1	Adelaide Parklands Circuit	1–4 March	Steve Mason	Chevrolet Camaro
2	Barbagallo Raceway, Wanneroo	24–25 March	Eddie Abelnica	Ford Mustang
3	Eastern Creek International Raceway	9–10 June	Steve Mason	Chevrolet Camaro
4	Eastern Creek International Raceway	1–2 September	Steve Mason	Chevrolet Camaro
5	Sandown International Motor Raceway	14–16 September	Jim Richards	Chevrolet Camaro
6	Mount Panorama Circuit, Bathurst	4–7 October	Steve Mason	Chevrolet Camaro
7	Symmons Plains International Raceway	16–18 November	Gavin Bullas	Ford Mustang
8	Phillip Island Grand Prix Circuit	30 November - 2 December	Jim Richards	Chevrolet Camaro

== Series standings ==
Pos.	Driver	Car	Class	Points
1	Steve Mason	Chevrolet Camaro	A	1627
2	Eddie Abelnica	Ford Mustang	A	1481
3	Gavin Bullas	Ford Mustang; Ford XY Falcon GT	A	1865
4	Mick Wilson	Chrysler VH Valiant Charger R/T	B	1364
5	Alastair MacLean	Chevrolet Camaro; Holden Torana GTR XU-1	A	1331
6	Drew Marget	Ford Mustang	A	1294
7	Brad Tilley	Ford XY Falcon GTHO	A	1204
8	Rory O'Neill	Porsche 911 RS	B	1149
9	Les Walmsley	Ford XY Falcon GTHO	A	1049
10	Stephen Hoinville	Ford Falcon GTHO; Ford Mustang; Ford Escort RS1600	B	958
11	Tony Hunter	Holden HQ Monaro; Chevrolet Camaro	A & B	898
12	Jim Richards	Chevrolet Camaro	A	743
13	Garry Treloar	Chevrolet Camaro	A	732
14	Peter McLean	Holden HT Monaro	A	650
15	Trevor Talbot	Holden LJ Torana GTR XU-1	B	537
16	Richard Fairlam	Holden HQ	B	492
17	Graeme Alexander	Holden HQ Monaro	A	456
18	Gary Baxter	Ford XY Falcon GT	A	395
19	Greg East	Holden HQ Kingswood	B	390
20	Greg Toepfer	Holden Torana GTR XU-1	B	381
21	Chris Wilson	Holden LJ Torana GTR XU-1	B	378
22	Chris Stillwell	Ford Mustang; Ford Escort RS1600	B	358
23	Bill Meeke	Ford XY Falcon GT	A	318
24	Gary O'Brien	Holden HQ	B	291
25	Cameron Mason	Datsun 1600	B	274
26	Lance Stannard	Ford XY Falcon GTHO	A	254
27	Rod Wilson	Ford XY Falcon GTHO	A	238
28	John Mann	Ford Mustang	B	227
29	Graham Stewart	Holden LJ Torana GTR XU-1	B	183
30	Darrin Davies	Ford XY Falcon GT	A	179
31	Cameron Tilley	Chrysler VH Valiant Charger R/T	B	137
32	Elton Treloar	Chrysler VH Valiant Charger R/T	B	129
33	Mark Forge	Porsche 911	B	125
34	Ray Challis	Ford XY Falcon GT	A	115
35	Mike Erwin	Ford XY Falcon GT	A	107
