= 2008 Biante Touring Car Masters =

Australian motor racing series

2008 Touring Car Masters

Seasons
- ← 2007 2009 →

The 2008 Biante Touring Car Masters was an Australian motor racing series for pre-1974 Touring Cars. It was the second annual Touring Car Masters.

Division 1 was won by Gavin Bullas driving a Ford Mustang and Division 2 by Greg East driving a Holden HQ.

== Schedule ==
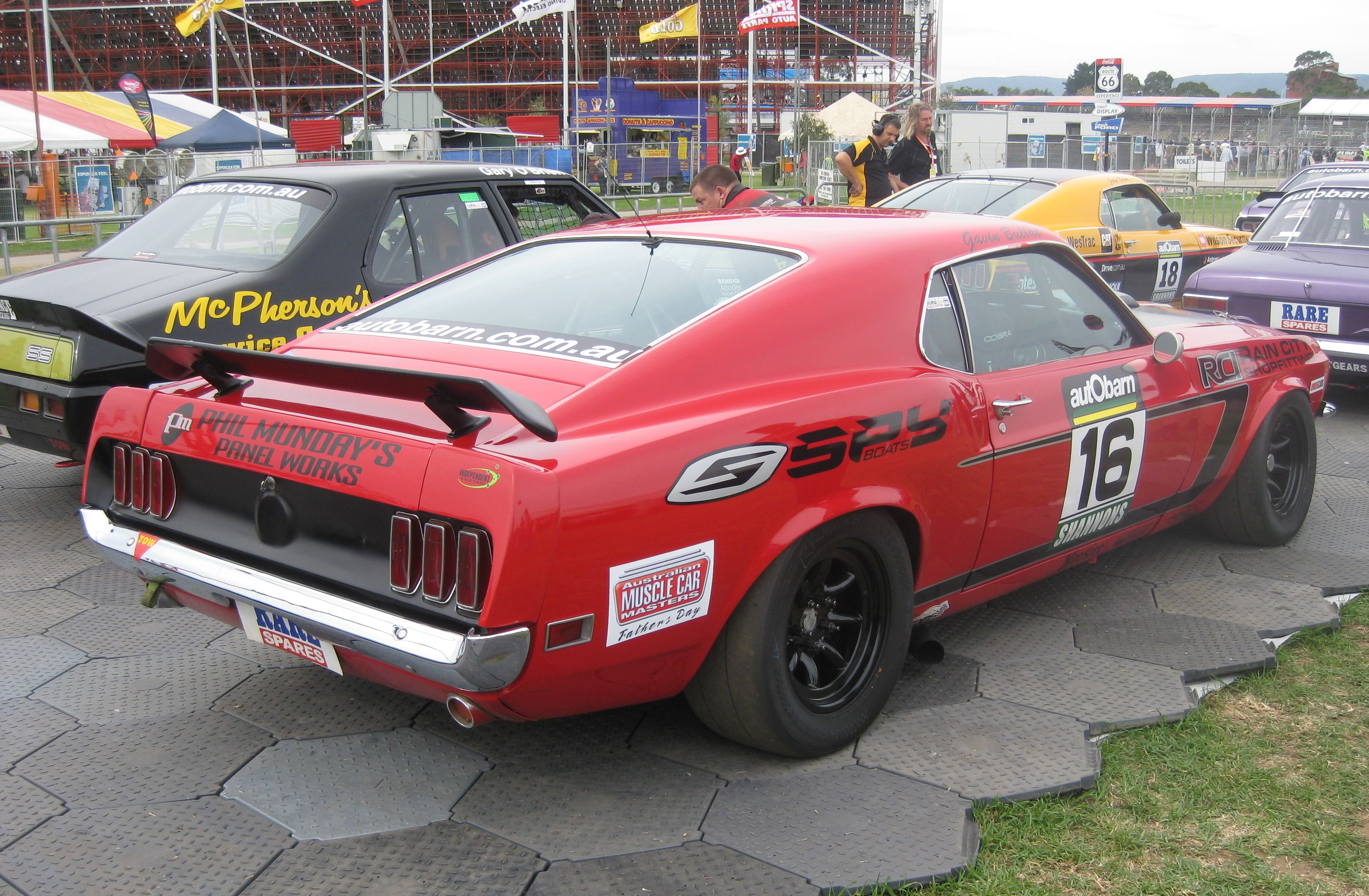
Gavin Bullas won Division 1 driving a Ford Mustang (pictured in 2011)

The series was contested over eight rounds.

Round	Circuit	Date	Format	Round winner	Car
1	Adelaide Parklands Circuit	21–24 February	Four Races	Steve Mason	Chevrolet Camaro
2	Oran Park Raceway	25–27 April	Three races	Gavin Bullas	Ford Mustang
3	Hidden Valley Raceway	4–6 July	Three races	John Bowe	Chevrolet Camaro
4	Winton Motor Raceway	1–3 August	Three races	Gavin Bullas	Ford Mustang
5	Eastern Creek International Raceway	6–7 September	Three races	Gavin Bullas	Ford Mustang
6	Phillip Island Grand Prix Circuit	12–14 September	Three races	John Bowe	Chevrolet Camaro
7	Symmons Plains International Raceway	21–23 November	Three races	Gavin Bullas	Ford Mustang
8	Oran Park Raceway	4–7 December	Three races	John Bowe	Chevrolet Camaro

== Points system ==
Cars competed in two classes designated as Division 1 & Division 2.

Series points were awarded on the following basis in each Division in each race:

Position	1st	2nd	3rd	4th	5th	6th	7th	8th	9th	10th	11th	12th	13th	14th	15th	16th	17th	18th	19th	20th	21st	22nd	23rd	24th	25th	26th	27th	28th	29th	30th
Points	60	56	52	48	45	42	39	36	33	30	27	24	21	18	17	16	15	14	13	12	11	10	9	8	7	6	5	4	3	2

Where four races were run in a round, the points were awarded for Races 2, 3 & 4.

Each driver was permitted to count his/her best seven round results.

== Series standings ==
Division 1			
Position	Driver	Car	Points
1	Gavin Bullas	Ford Mustang	1273
2	John Bowe	Chevrolet Camaro	997.5
3	Steve Mason	Chevrolet Camaro	997
4	Brad Tilley	Ford XY Falcon GT	822
5	Drew Marget	Ford Mustang	763
6	Jim Richards	Ford Mustang & Ford Falcon Sprint	711
7	Alastair MacLean	Chevrolet Camaro	702
8	Steve Makarios	Ford XY Falcon GTHO	501
9	Eddie Abelnica	Ford Boss Mustang	470
10	Graham Alexander	Holden HQ	354
11	Rod Wilson	Ford XY Falcon GT	272
12	John Woodbury	Holden HQ	248
13	Tony Hunter	Holden Monaro	240
14	Dean Lilliee	Ford XY Falcon GTHO	152
15	Brett Youlden	Holden HQ	140
16	Jerremy Mantello	Holden HT Monaro	135
17	Cameron Tilley	Chrysler Valiant Pacer	39
Division 2			
Position	Driver	Car	Points
1	Greg East	Holden HQ	1049.5
2	Rory O'Neill	Porsche 911 RS	976.5
3	Trevor Talbot	Holden LJ Torana GTR XU-1	966
4	John Nelson	Porsche 911 RS	768
5	Ian McAllister	Ford Mustang	621.5
6	Mick Wilson	Chrysler VH Valiant Charger R/T	612.5
7	Garry Treloar	Chrysler VH Valiant Charger R/T	506
8	Richard Fairlam	Holden HQ	447
9	Garry Young	Ford Mustang	445
10	Steve Makarios	Ford XY Falcon GTHO	390 ?
11	Cameron Mason	Datsun 510	420
12	Bernie Stack	Porsche 911 RS	329
13	Mike Erwin	Ford XY Falcon GT	306
14	Nigel Benson	Ford XY Falcon GT & Holden Monaro	304
15	Greg Waddington	Holden HQ	286
16	Cameron Tilley	Chrysler Valiant Pacer	237
17	Stephen Hoinville	Ford Mustang & Ford Escort RS1600	228
18	Phil Brock	Ford XY Falcon GT	210
19	Chris Stillwell	Ford Escort RS1600	177
20	Tony Hunter	Holden Monaro	168
21	Ray Challis	Ford XY Falcon GT	129
22	Steven Richards	Ford Escort RS1600	120
23	Mark Forgie	Porsche 911 RS	117
24	Charlie O'Brien	Ford Mustang	116
25	Chris Wilson	Holden LJ Torana GTR XU-1	90
26	Glenn Seton	Ford Escort RS1600	90
27	Michael Acheson	Chrysler VH Valiant Charger R/T	57
28	Elton Treloar	Chrysler VH Valiant Charger R/T	45
29	Tony Edwards	Holden Monaro	36
