= Ford Falcon (XY) =

Australian full-size car

Ford XY Falcon
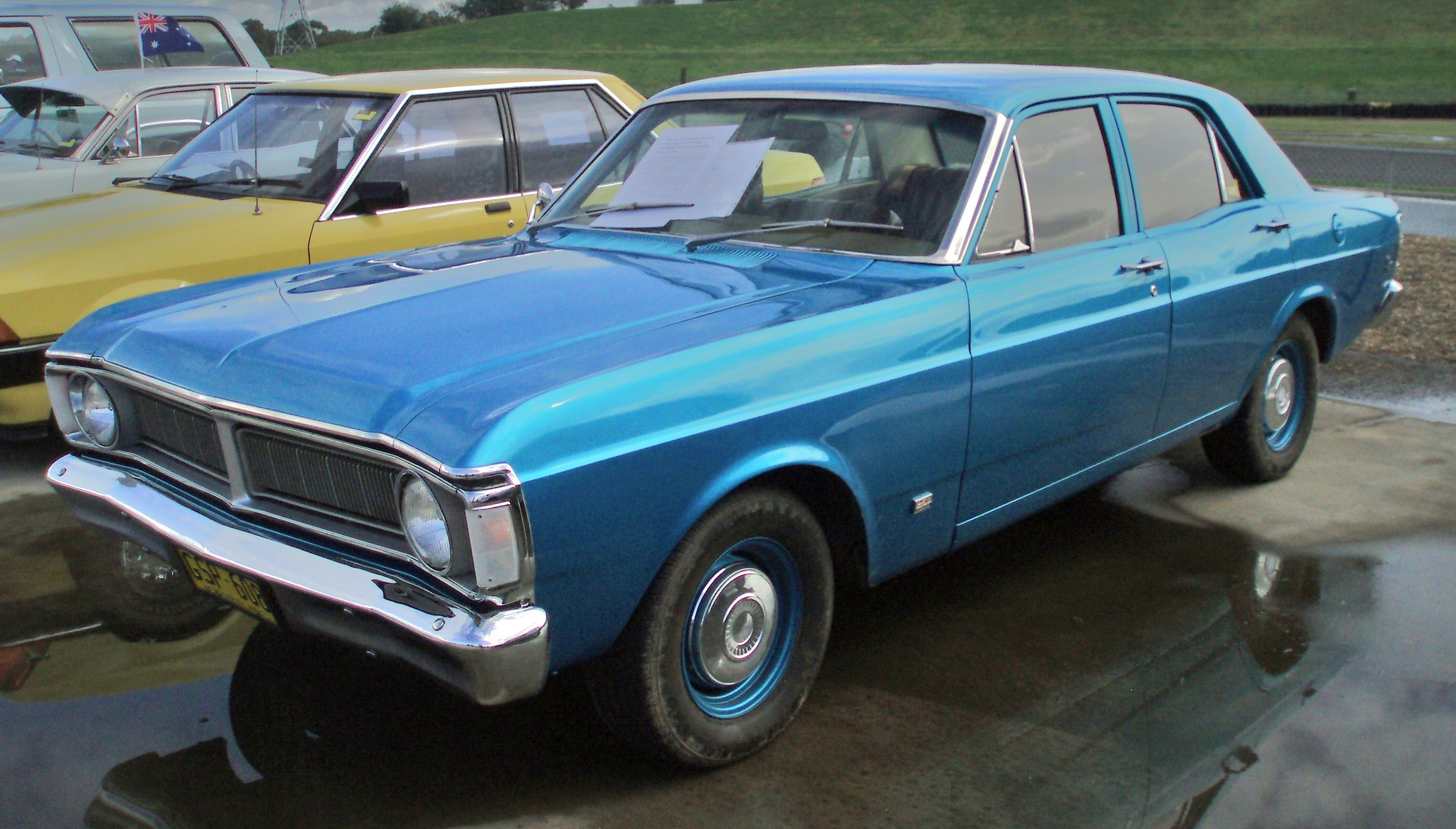
- Ford Falcon sedan

Overview
- Manufacturer: Ford Australia
- Also called: XY Futura; XY Fairmont
- Production: October 1970 – March 1972
- Assembly: Australia; Port Elizabeth, South Africa

Body and chassis
- Class: Full-size car
- Body style: 4-door sedan 5-door station wagon 2-door coupe utility 2-door panel van
- Layout: FR layout F4 layout

Powertrain
- Engine: 200 cu in (3.3 L) I6; 250 cu in (4.1 L) I6; 302 cu in (4.9 L) "small block" V8; 351 cu in (5.8 L) "Cleveland" V8
- Transmission: 3-speed manual 4-speed manual 3-speed “Cruisomatic” automatic

Dimensions
- Wheelbase: 2,819 mm (111.0 in)
- Length: 4,689 mm (184.6 in)
- Width: 1,869 mm (73.6 in)
- Height: 1,417 mm (55.8 in)
- Kerb weight: 1,362 kg (3,002.7 lb)

Chronology
- Predecessor: XW Falcon
- Successor: XA Falcon

The Ford Falcon (XY) is a full-size car produced by Ford Australia from 1970 to 1972. It was the fourth and last iteration of the second generation of the Falcon and included the Ford Fairmont (XY)—the luxury-oriented version.

== Overview ==
The XY Falcon was released in October 1970 replacing the XW Falcon. The XY was a facelift of the XW, featuring a new divided grille and redesigned tail lights. A new range of six-cylinder and V8 engines was introduced, and improvements were made to seating, safety equipment and ride quality.

== Model range ==
The XY Falcon range featured eight passenger vehicles and three commercial models.

- Ford Falcon Sedan
- Ford Falcon Wagon
- Ford Falcon 500 Sedan
- Ford Falcon 500 Wagon
- Ford Futura Sedan
- Ford Fairmont Sedan
- Ford Fairmont Wagon
- Ford Falcon GT Sedan
- Ford Falcon Utility
- Ford Falcon Van
- Ford Falcon 500 Utility
- Ford Falcon Limousine
- Ford Falcon Panel Van

Futura and Fairmont models, whilst marketed as part of the XY Falcon range, were not officially referred to or badged as Falcons.

A GS Rally Pack was available as an option on the Falcon 500, Futura and Fairmont Sedans and Wagons.

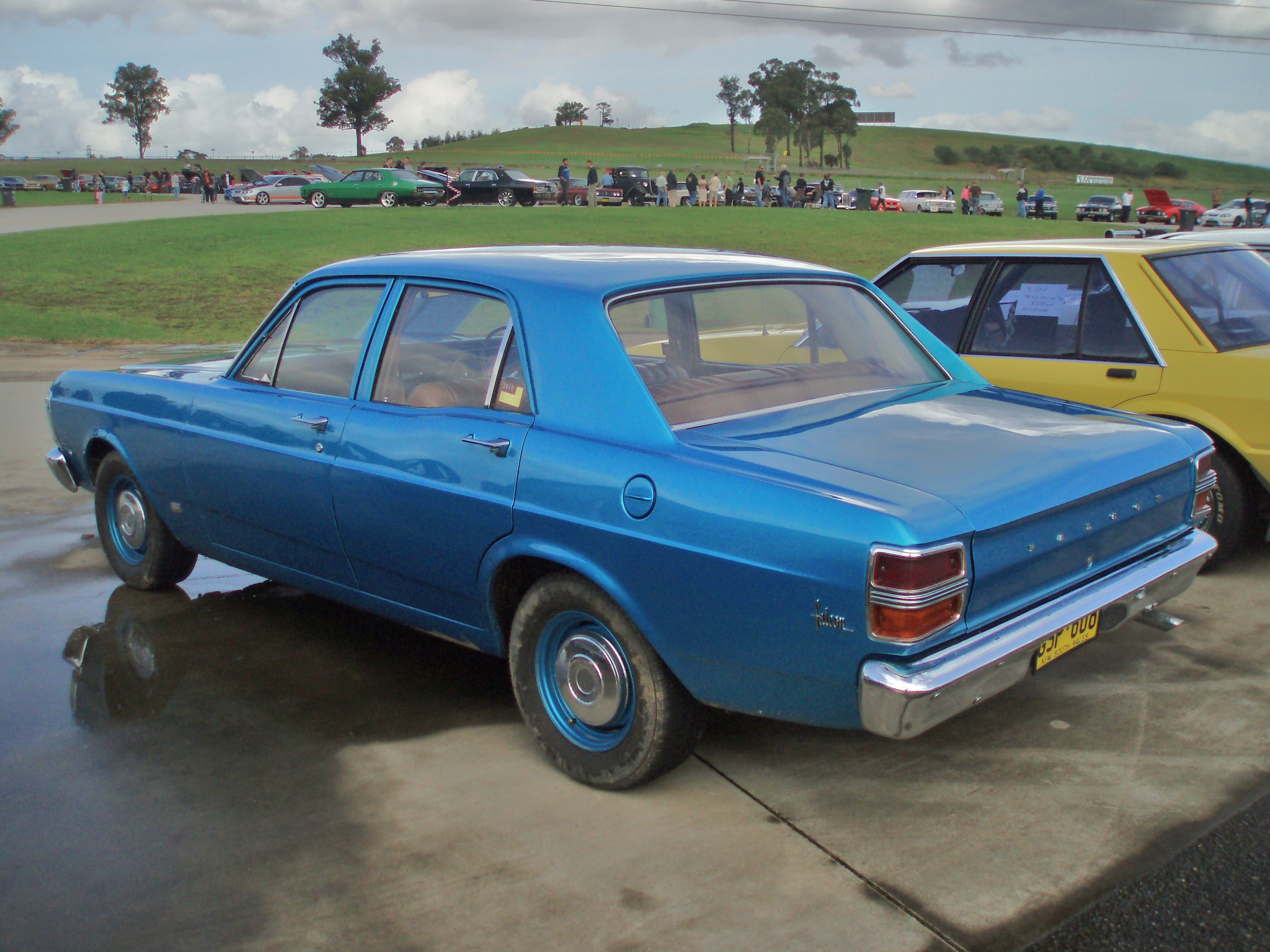
Ford Falcon sedan

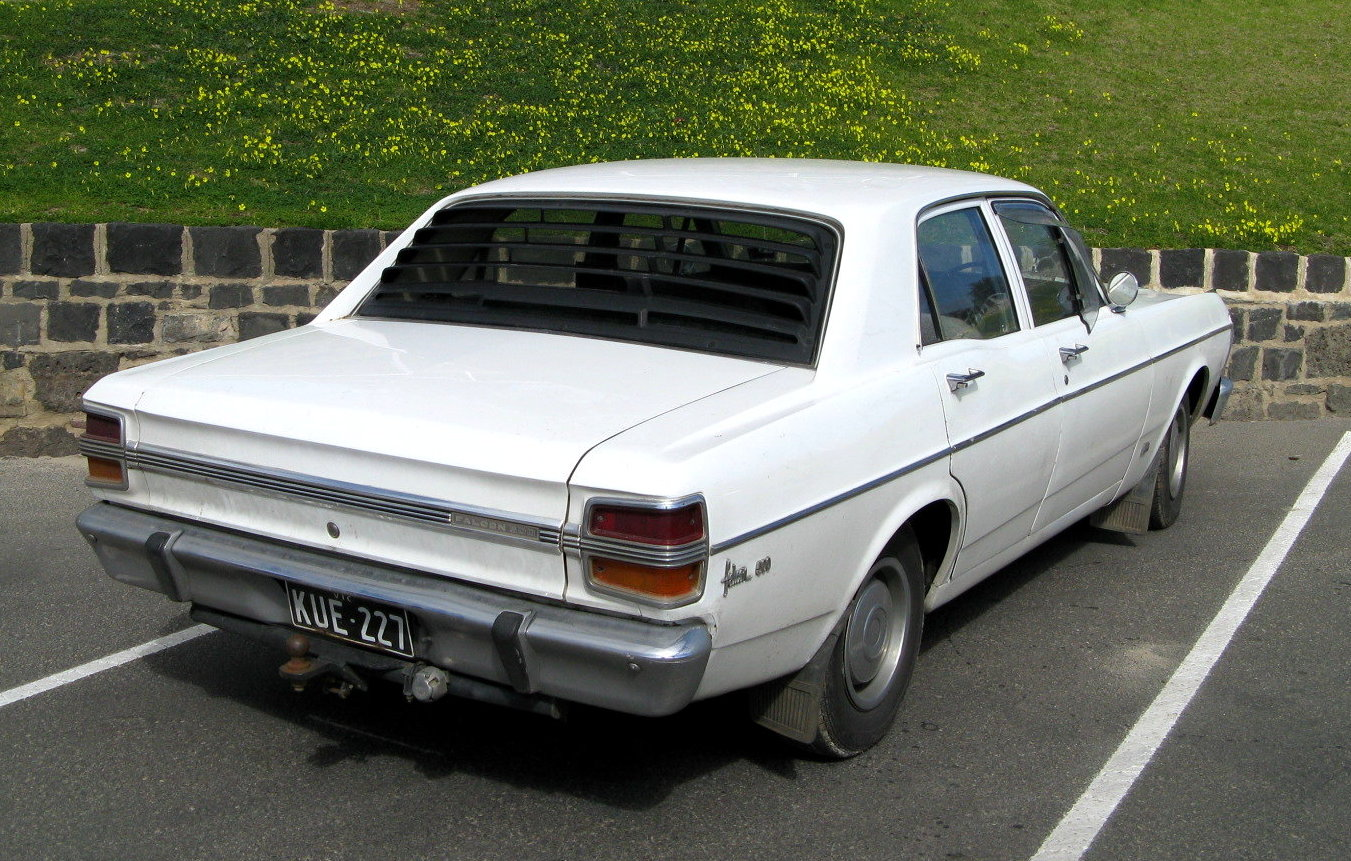
Ford Falcon 500 sedan

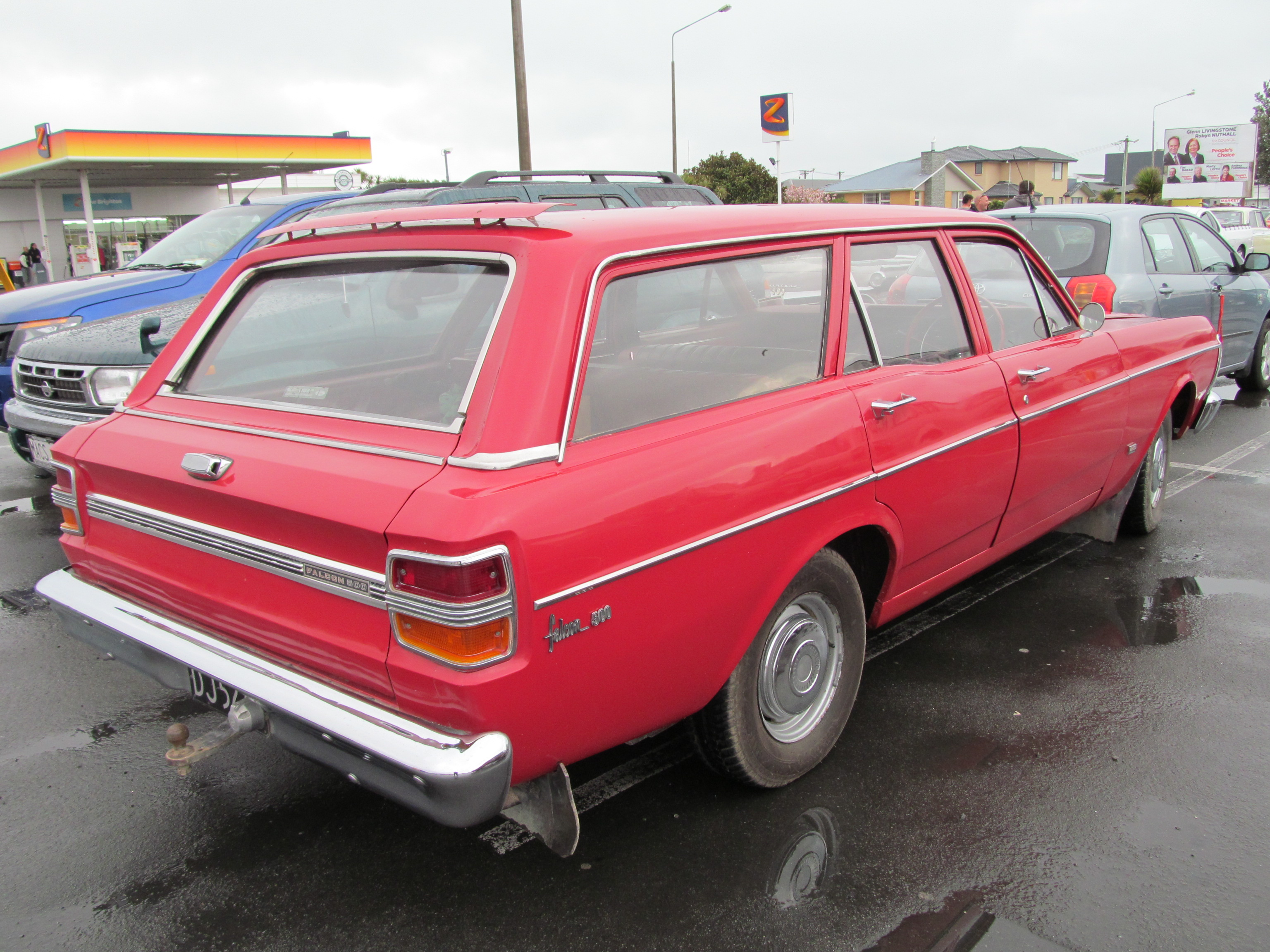
Ford Falcon 500 wagon

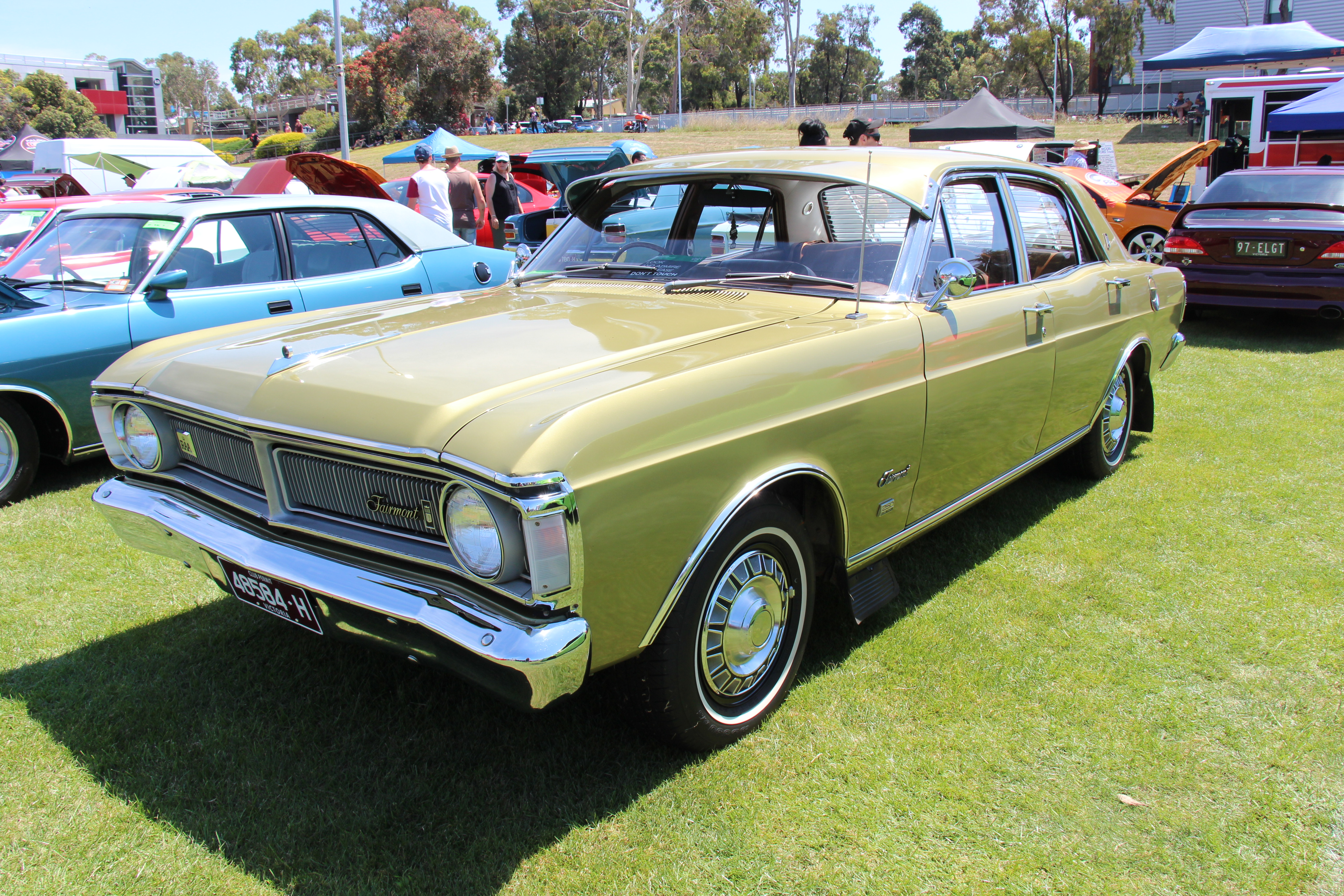
Ford Fairmont sedan

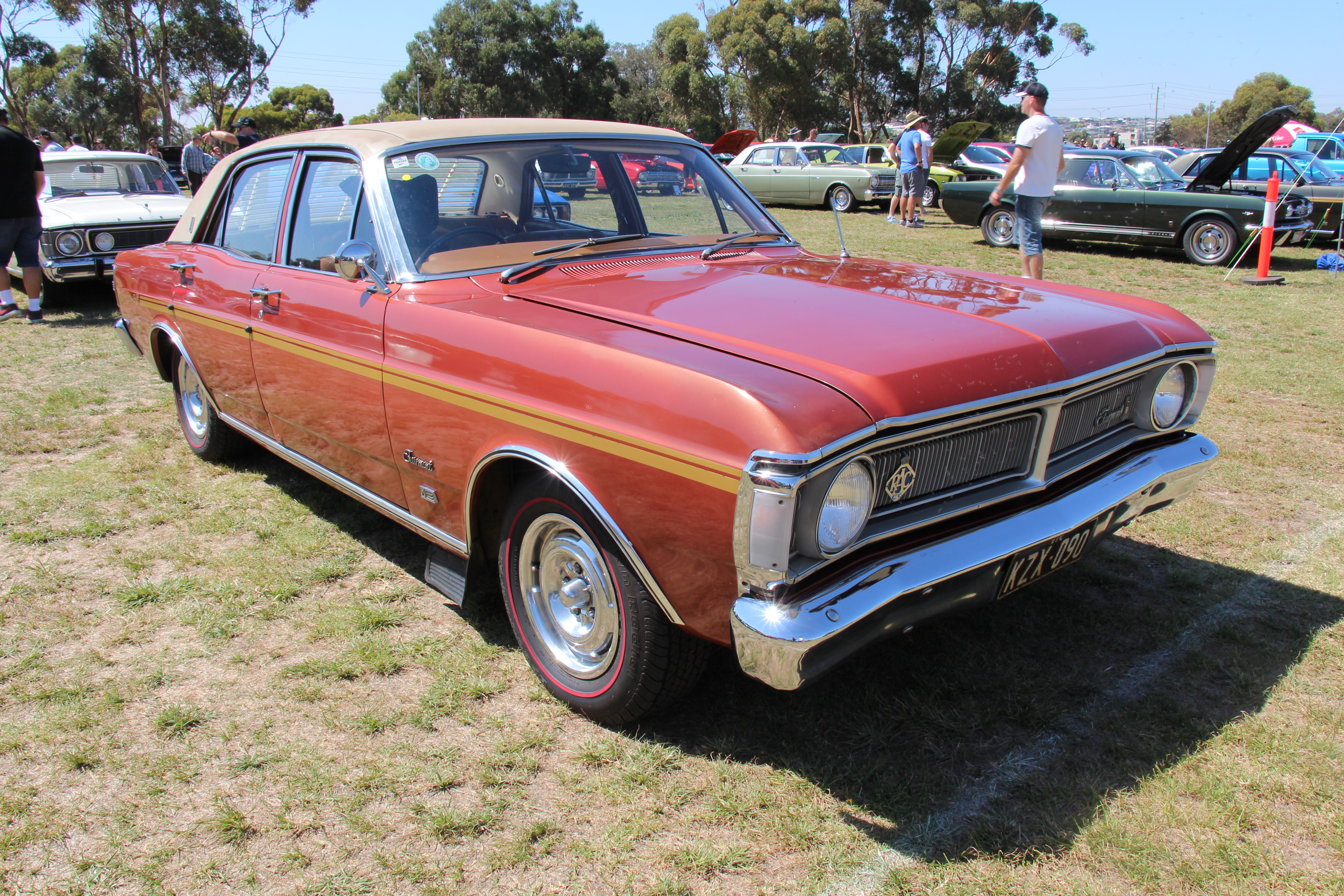
Ford Fairmont sedan with GS Rally Pack

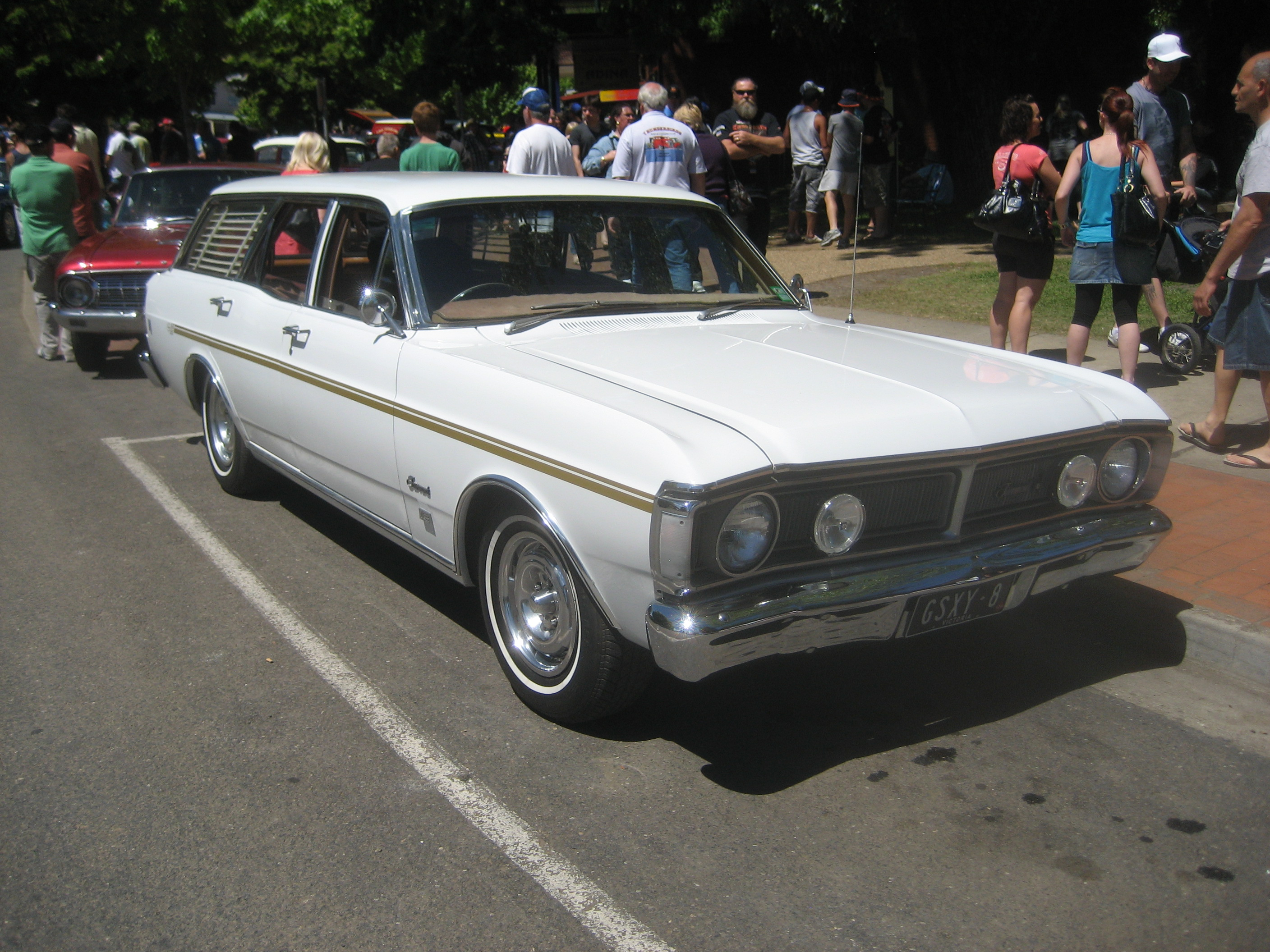
Ford Fairmont wagon with GS Rally Pack

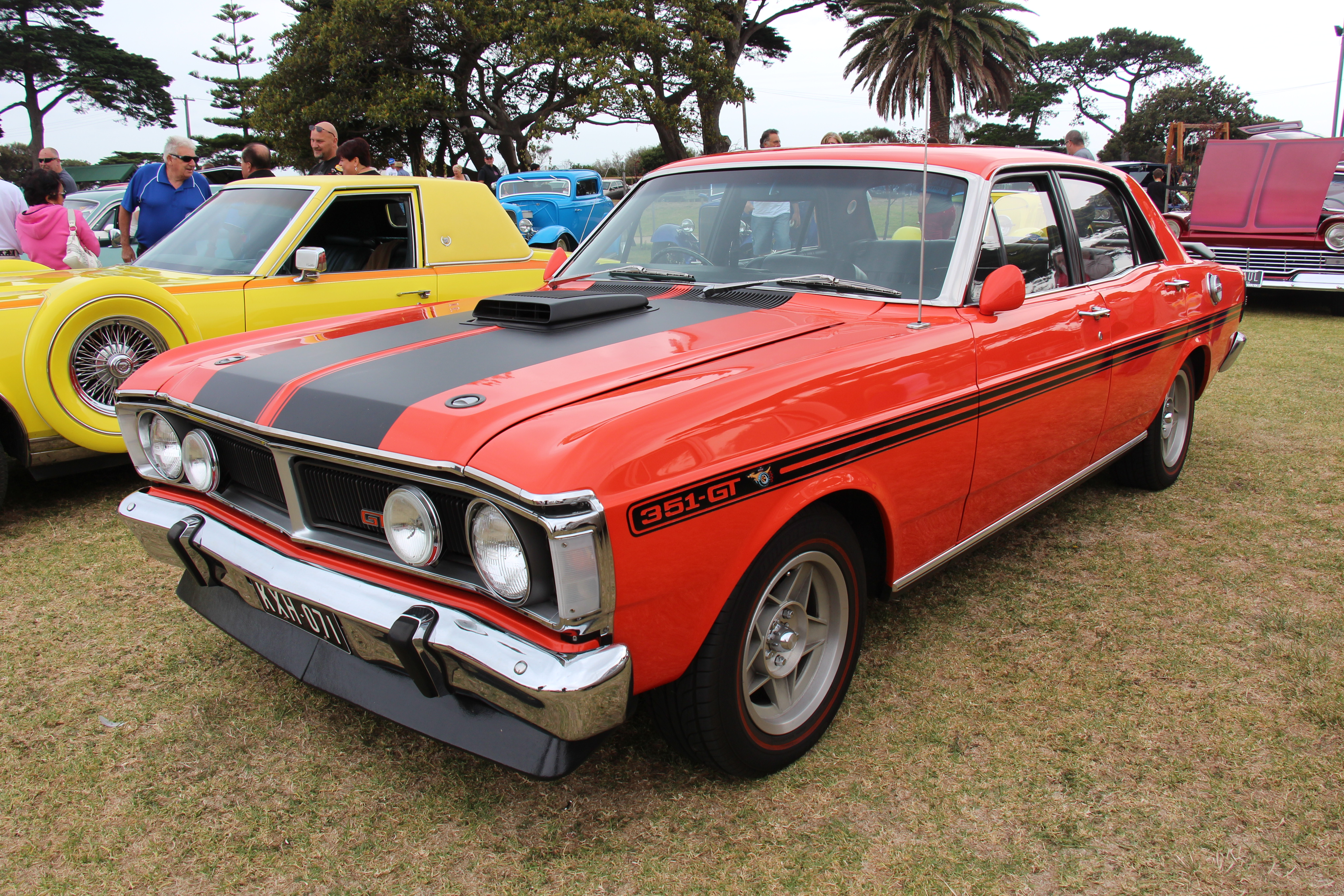
Ford XY Falcon GTHO (non-standard wheels)

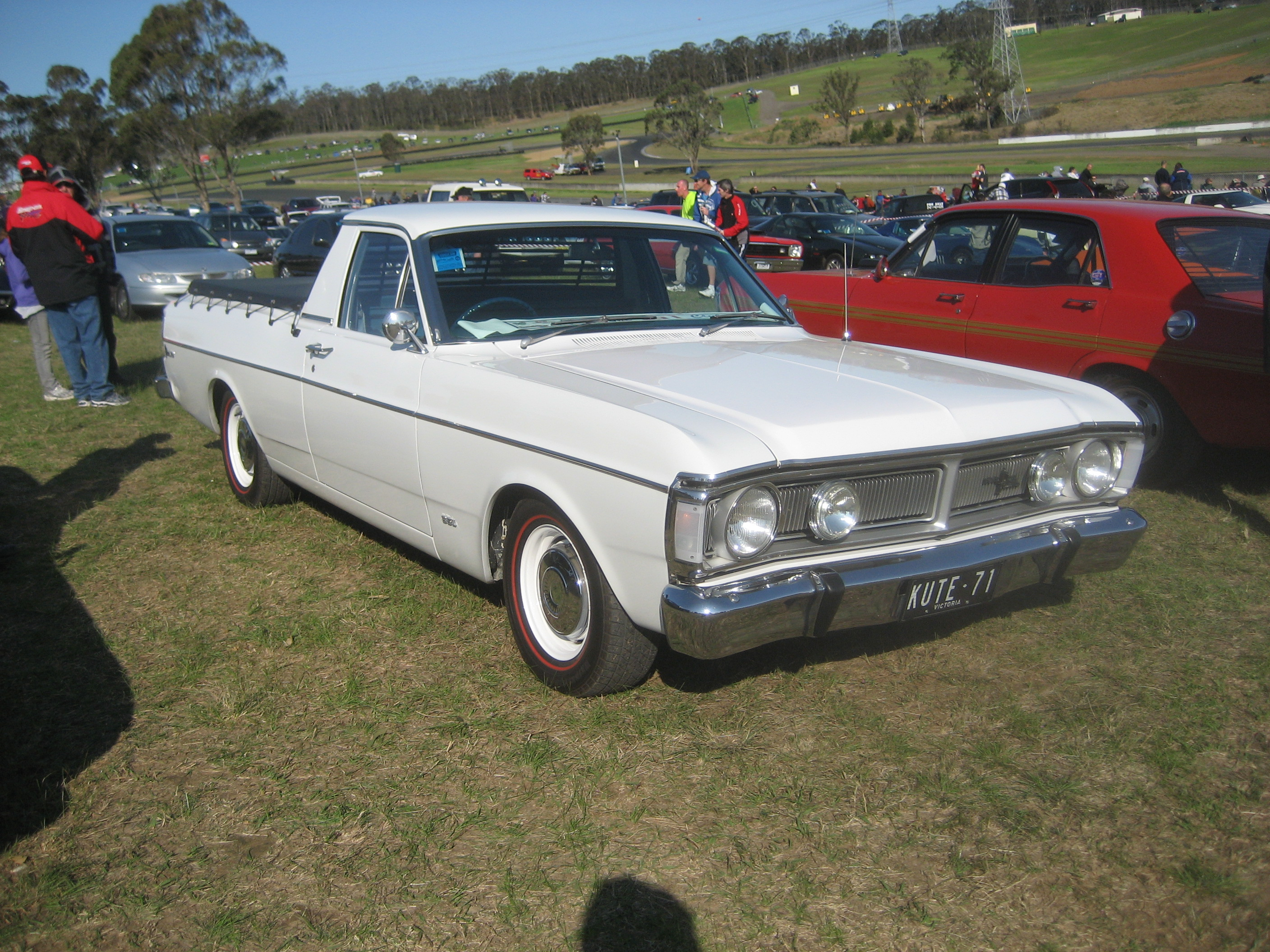
Ford Falcon Utility

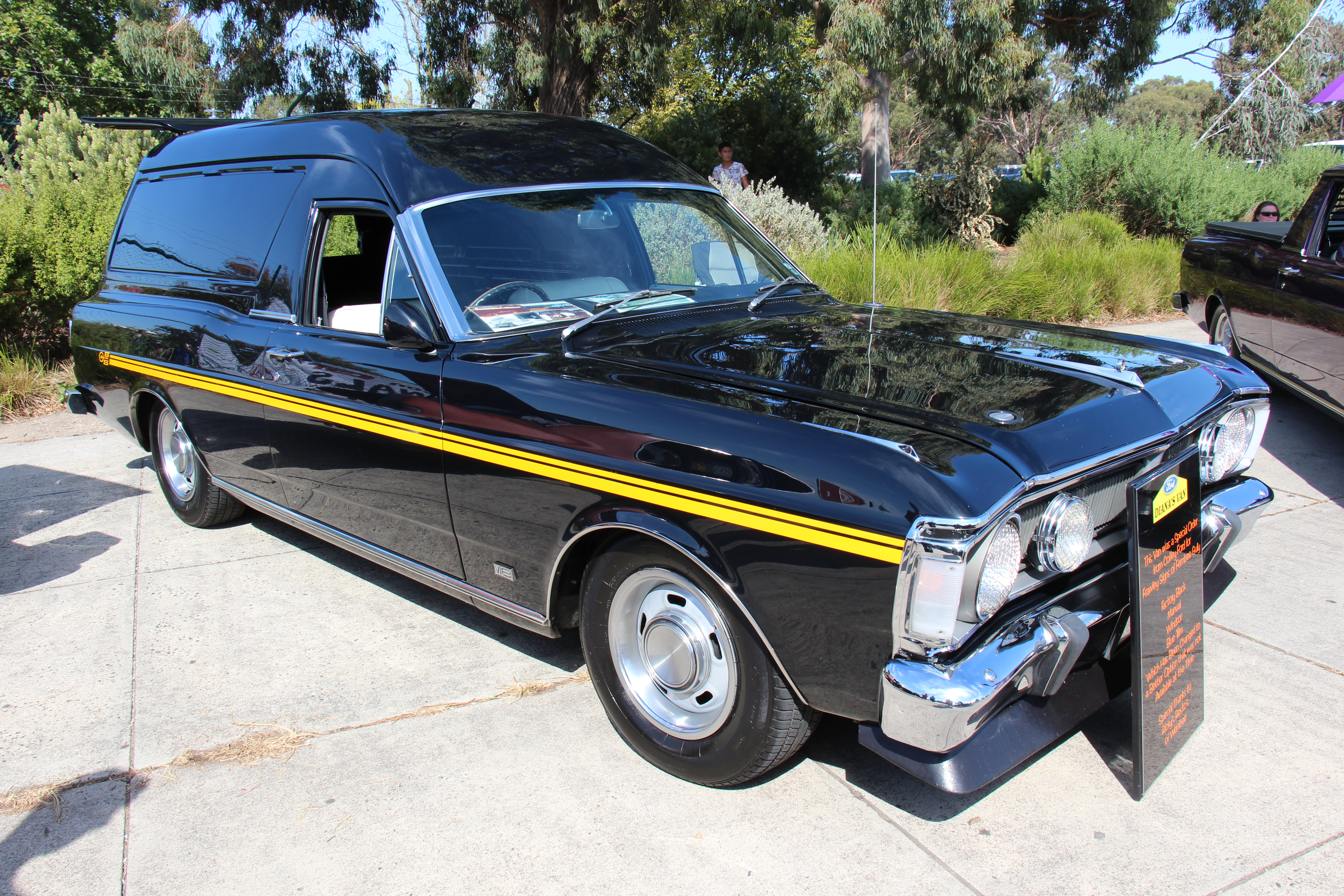
Ford Falcon Panel Van (non-standard wheels & front spoiler)

=== Falcon GTHO Phase III ===
A high-performance Falcon GTHO Phase III was released in May 1971.

=== Falcon 4-wheel-drive utility ===
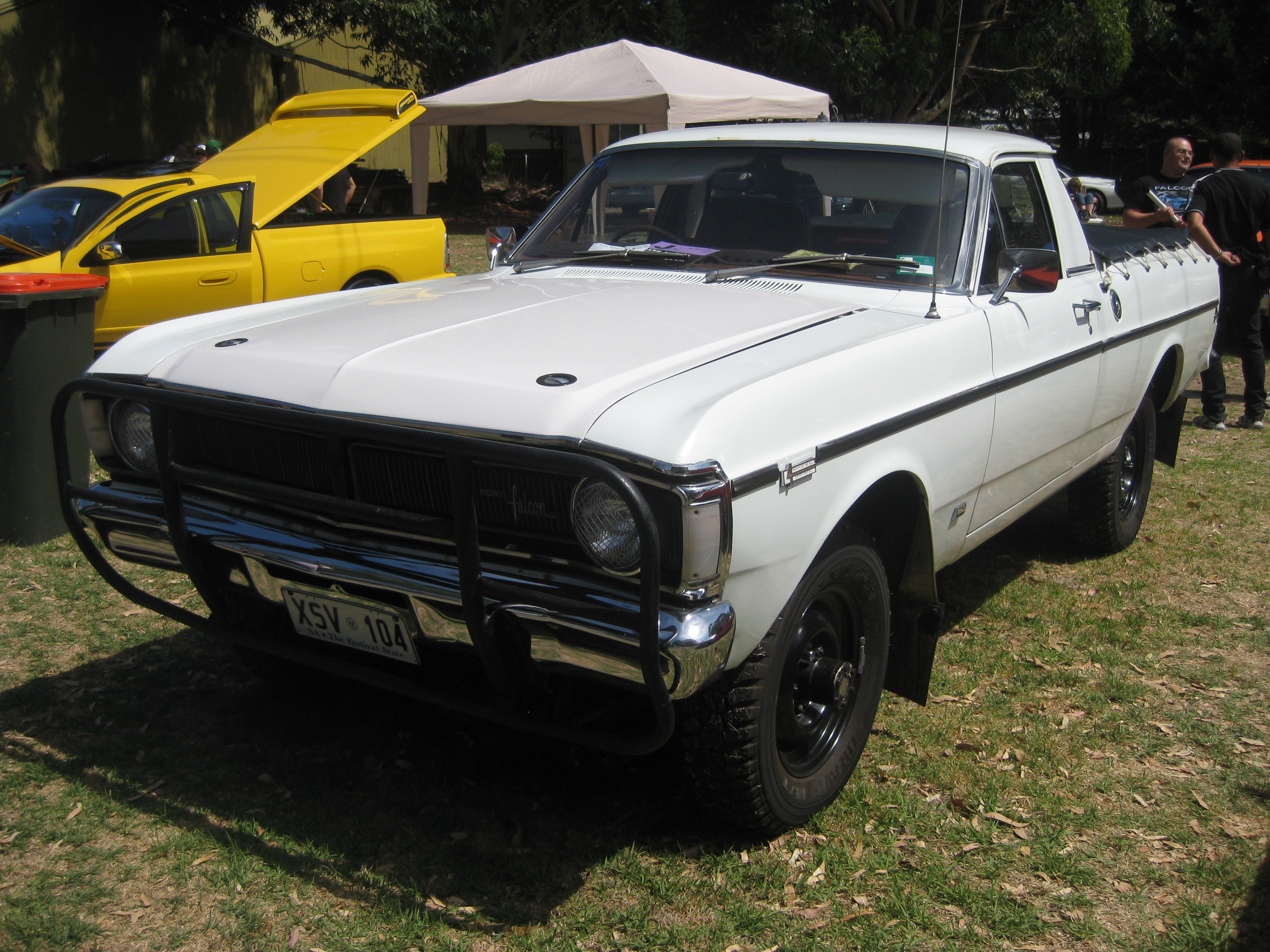
Ford Falcon 4-wheel-drive-utility

A four-wheel-drive version of the Utility was produced in 1972. It was marketed simply as the Falcon 4-wheel-drive utility and 432 examples were built.

== Engines ==
New 200 cu in (3.3 L) and 250 cu in (4.1 L) inline six-cylinder engines replaced the smaller-capacity sixes offered in the XW. The 302 cu in (4.9 L) and 351 cu in (5.8 L) V8s were carried over from the previous range, though the larger capacity small block was dropped and only the Cleveland engine was available. A 250 hp (190 kW) version of the Cleveland engine, with a two-barrelled 2V (venturi) carburetor was the top option on the XY Falcon and ZD Fairmont range. The 300 hp (220 kW), four-barrelled, 4V version of the engine was only offered on the XY GT and GTHO.

== Production ==
Production of the XY Falcon range totalled 118,666 vehicles. 1,557 XY Falcon GTs and 300 XY GT-HOs were built.

== Replacement ==
The XY range was replaced by the XA Falcon in March 1972.
