= 1970 Sandown Three Hour 250 =

The 1970 Sandown Three Hour 250 was a motor race for Series Production Touring Cars. It was organized by the Light Car Club of Australia and was held on 13 September 1970 over 130 laps of the 1.9 mile Sandown Park circuit in Victoria, Australia, a total of 247 miles. There were 42 starters in the event.

Canadian race driver Allan Moffat won the second of his five Sandown endurance race victories. Moffat drove a factory-entered Ford Falcon GTHO to a one lap victory over Holden Dealer Team driver, Colin Bond (Holden Torana). Chrysler factory-supported driver Norm Beechey (Chrysler Valiant Pacer) finished in third position, three laps behind Bond.

This event, revived from a previous six-hour format, debuted in 1968 and quickly became the recognized precursor event to the annual Bathurst 500 / 1000 race.

== Classes ==
Cars competed in five price classes:

- Class A: Up To $1,960
- Class B: $1,961 to $2,400
- Class C: $2,401 to $3,150
- Class D: $3,151 to $4,100
- Class E: Over $4,100

== Results ==
Position	Drivers	No.	Car	Entrant	Class	Class Pos.	Laps
1	Alan Moffat	50	Ford XW Falcon GTHO Phase 2	Ford Motor Company of Australia	E	1	130
2	Colin Bond	20	Holden Torana GTR XU-1	Holden Dealer Team	C	1	129
3	Norm Beechey	41	Chrysler VG Valiant Pacer 4BBL	Norm Beechey Shell Racing	D	1	126
4	Peter Brock	21	Holden Torana GTR XU-1	Holden Dealer Team	C	2	125
5	Doug Chivas, Graham Ryan	32	Chrysler VG Valiant Pacer 2BBL	Geoghegan's Sporty Cars	C	3	125
6	Fred Gibson, Barry Seton	52	Ford XW Falcon GTHO Phase 2	Ford Motor Company of Australia	E	2	124
7	Clem Smith	42	Chrysler VG Valiant Pacer 4BBL	Clem Smith	D	2	122
8	Ian Strachan	24	Holden Torana GTR XU-1	IOC Australia Pty. Ltd.	C	4	119
9	John Piper	28	Ford Escort Twin Cam	Bill Evans Developments	C	5	119
10	Bruce McPhee	51	Ford XW Falcon GTHO Phase 2	Ford Motor Company of Australia	E	3	119
11	Bill Gates	29	Ford Escort Twin Cam	Mortley Ford Pty. Ltd.	C	6	118
12	Tony Roberts	60	Ford XW Falcon GTHO Phase 2	Tony Roberts Team	E	4	118
13	John Walker	30	Chrysler VG Valiant Pacer 2BBL	Clem Smith	C	7	118
14	Pat Peck	56	Ford XW Falcon GTHO Phase 2	D & P Traders Pty. Ltd.	E	5	115
15	Doug Whiteford	11	Datsun 1600	Datsun Racing Team	B	1	114
16	John Mooney	18	Holden LC Torana 2600S	John Mooney	B	2	113
17	Graeme Blanchard, Terry Robertson	25	Holden LC Torana GTR XU-1	Blanchard Motors	C	8	111
18	Christine Cole, Sandra Bennett	22	Holden LC Torana GTR XU-1	Holden Dealer Team	C	9	111
19	Clive Millis, Ken Hastings	4	Mazda 1300	Clive Millis Motors	A	1	111
20	Mel Mollison, Roger Withers	6	Mazda 1300	R. G. Lanyon	A	2	110
21	Robert Hudson, Ray Parker	19	Datsun 1600	Robert Hudson	B	3	109
22	Jim Murcott	27	Ford Escort Twin Cam	Jim Murcott	C	10	108
23	P. Granger, K. Merz	3	Toyota Corolla	Scuderia Avanti	A	3	103
24	M. D. Matheson	34	Morris Cooper S	M. D. Matheson	C	11	103
25	Don Preece	8	Ford Escort 1300	Bob Rollington Pty. Ltd.	A	4	102
DNF	Murray Carter	54	Ford XW Falcon GTHO Phase 2	Bob Rollington Pty. Ltd.	E	-	99
DNF	Leo Geoghegan	31	Chrysler VG Valiant Pacer 2BBL	Geoghegan's Sporty Cars	C	-	98
DNF	Dick Thurston, Bill Evans	1	Toyota Corolla	Pitstop Motors	A	-	89
DNF	John Chapple	17	Ford Escort 1300GT	John Chapple	B	-	81
DNF	Des West, Peter Brown	40	Chrysler VG Valiant Pacer 4BBL	Geoghegan's Sporty Cars	C	-	59
DNF	Geoff Perry, Kevin Wanstall	7	Mazda 1300	Geoff Perry	A	-	59
DNF	Bob Holden, Bill Fanning	55	Ford XW Falcon GTHO Phase 2	The Mennen Co. (Aust.) Pty. Ltd.	E	-	52
DNF	Rod Murphy	16	Mitsubishi Colt 1100 SS	Esquire Motors	B	-	51
DNF	Bob Jane, John Harvey	26	Holden LC Torana GTR XU-1	Bob Jane Shell Racing	C	-	43
DNF	David Yates, Brian Reed	23	Holden LC Torana GTR XU-1	Booran Motors Pty. Ltd.	C	-	29
DNF	Richard Knight, Graham Ritter	58	Ford XW Falcon GTHO Phase 2	B. S. Stillwell & Co. Pty. Ltd.	E	-	16
DNF	Bob Watson, Bruce Watt	14	Renault 10S	John Ould Motors	B	-	16
DNF	Tom Roddy	53	Ford XW Falcon GTHO Phase 2	Bob Rollington Pty. Ltd.	E	-	15
Disq.	John Roxburgh	9	Datsun 1200	Datsun Racing Team	A	-	112
Disq.	Barry Tapsall, Bob Punch	10	Datsun 1200	Datsun Racing Team	A	-	109
Disq.	Bill Stanley	2	Toyota Corolla	Marque Motors	A	-	104
Disq.	Gary Rush, Martin Chenery	61	Ford XW Falcon GTHO Phase 2	Byrt Ford Pty. Ltd.	E	-	21

Preceded by 1969 Datsun Three Hour	Sandown 250; 1970	Succeeded by 1971 Sandown 250
