= 2010 Touring Car Masters =

Australian motor racing competition

Seasons
- ← 2009 2011 →

The 2010 Touring Car Masters was Australian motor racing competition for Touring Cars. The series was open to models manufactured between 1 January 1963 and 31 December 1973 and to specific models manufactured between 1 January 1974 and 31 December 1976. It was sanctioned by the Confederation of Australian Motor Sport (CAMS) as a National Series and ‘Australian Classic Touring Cars’ was appointed by CAMS as the Category Manager. The series was the fourth annual Touring Car Masters.

Jim Richards (Ford Falcon Sprint) won Group 1, Bernie Stack (Porsche 911 RS) was victorious in Group 2 and Tony Karanfilovski (Alfa Romeo GTAm) secured the Group 3 award.

== Calendar ==
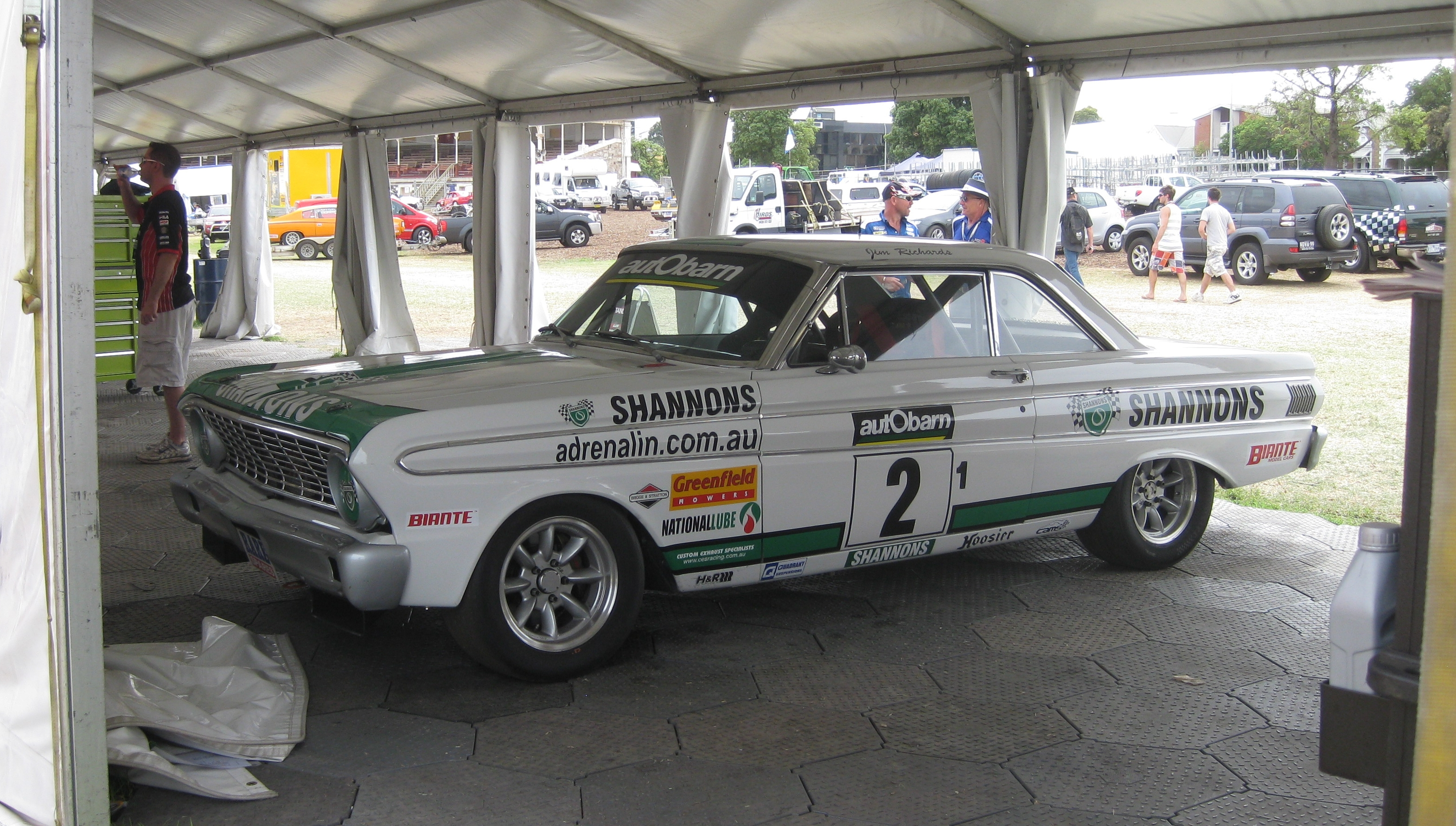
Jim Richards won Group 1 driving a 1964 Ford Falcon Sprint

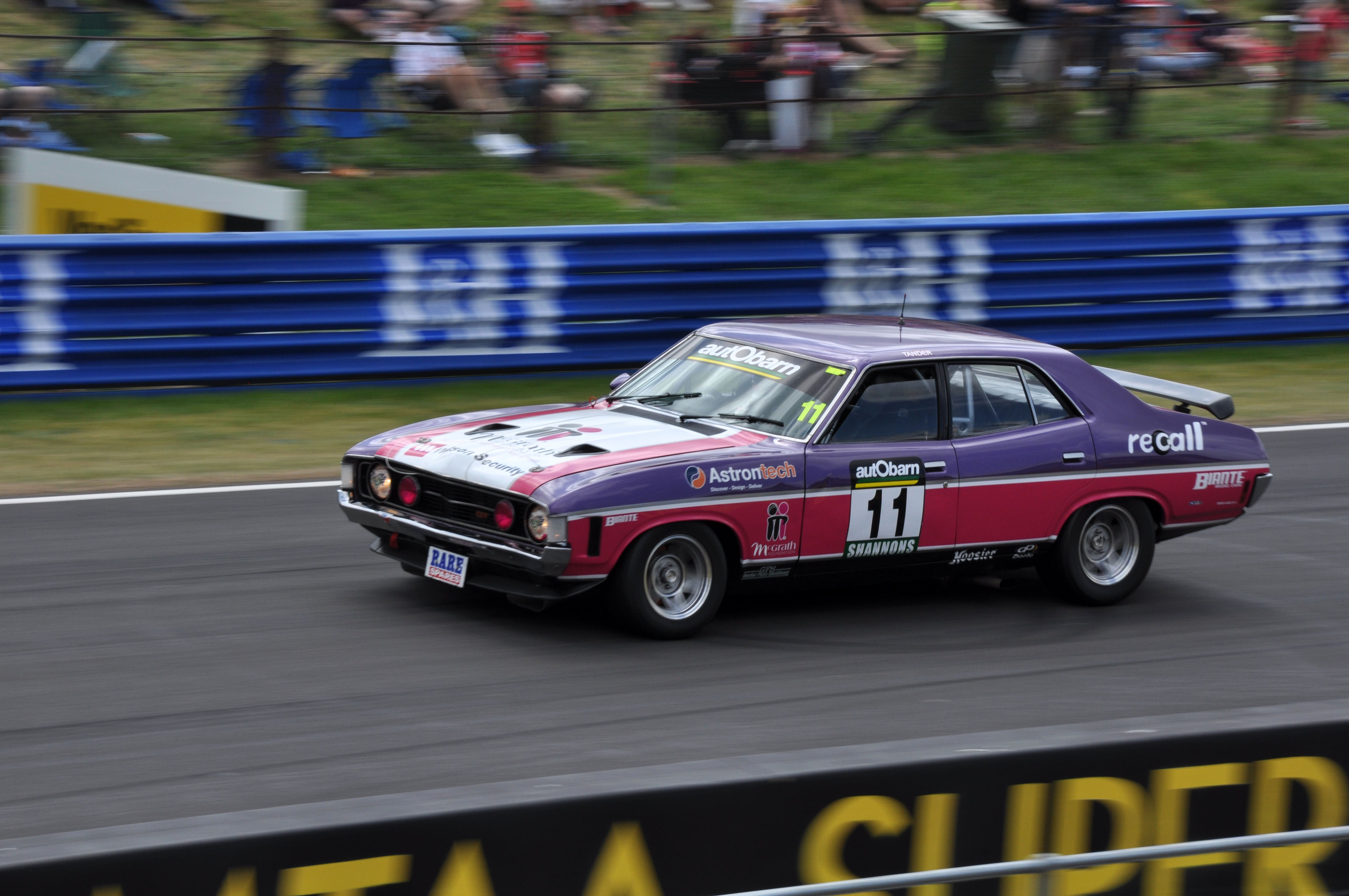
Leanne Tander placed fifth in Group 1 driving a Ford XA Falcon GT

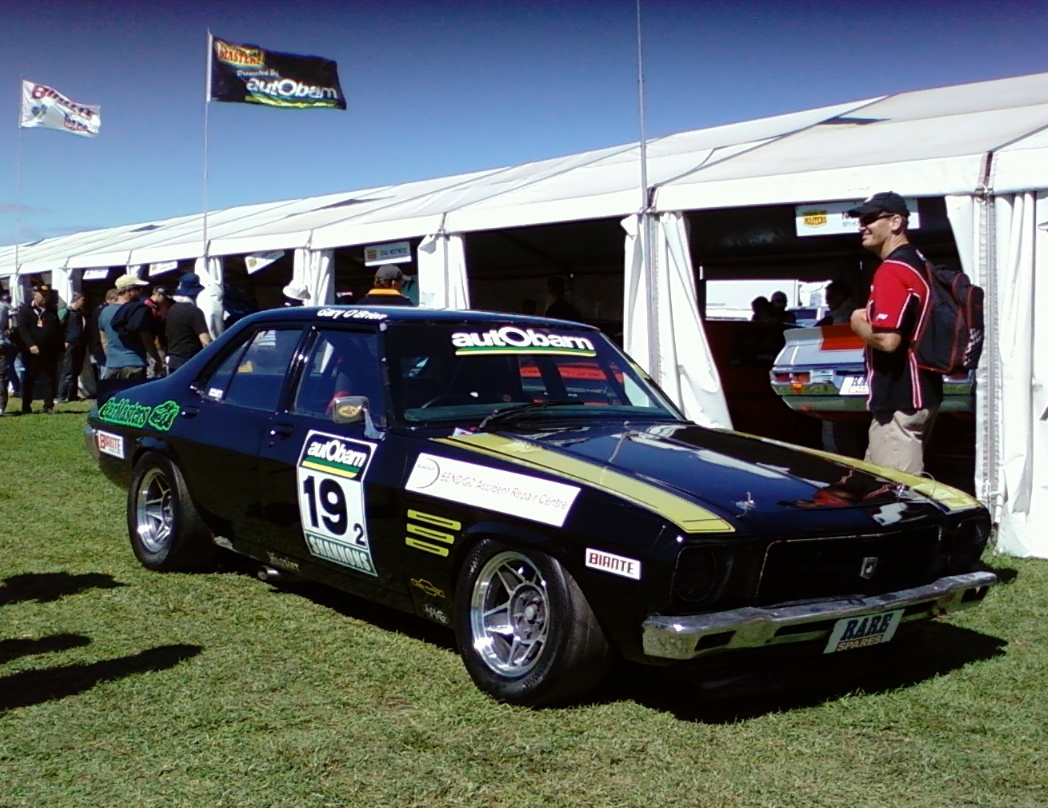
Gary O’Brien placed sixth in Group 2 driving a Holden HQ SS

The series was contested over eight rounds.

Round	Circuit	Date	Format	Round winner	Car
1	Adelaide Parklands Circuit	11-14 March	Three races	Andrew Miedecke	Chevrolet Camaro SS
2	Winton Motor Raceway	14-16 May	Three races	John Bowe	Ford Mustang
3	Hidden Valley Raceway	18-20 June	Three races	Jim Richards	Ford Falcon Sprint
4	Eastern Creek International Raceway	4-5 September	Three races	John Bowe	Ford Mustang
5	Mount Panorama, Bathurst	7-10 October	Three races	Jim Richards	Ford Falcon Sprint
6	Symmons Plains International Raceway	13-15 November	Three races	John Bowe	Ford Mustang
7	Sandown International Motor Raceway	19-21 November	Three races	Jim Richards	Ford Falcon Sprint
8	Sydney Olympic Park Street Circuit	3-5 December	Three races	Gavin Bullas	Ford Mustang

Note:

- Race 2 of Round 6 at Symmons Plains was cancelled due to scheduling issues brought about by damage caused to the safety fencing during the previous race.
- Race 2 of Round 7 at Sandown was cut short due to an accident and was deemed a non-event.

== Classes ==
Cars competed in three Groups based on engine capacity:

- Group 1: Over 5100cc (plus Ford Falcon Sprint and Holden Torana SL/R 5000)
- Group 2: Over 2001cc and up to 5099cc
- Group 3: Up to 2000cc

== Points system ==
Series points were awarded on the following basis within each Group at each race.

Position	1st	2nd	3rd	4th	5th	6th	7th	8th	9th	10th	11th	12th	13th	14th	15th	16th	17th	18th	19th	20th	21st	22nd	23rd	24th	25th	26th	27th	28th	29th	30th
Points	60	56	52	48	45	42	39	36	33	30	27	24	21	18	17	16	15	14	13	12	11	10	9	8	7	6	5	4	3	2

== Series standings ==
Group 1													
Position	Driver	No.	Car	Competitor / Team	Ade	Win	Hid	Eas	Bat	Sym	San	Hom	Total
1	Jim Richards	2	Ford Falcon Sprint	Shannons Insurance	164	82	180	141	168	0	116	168	1019
2	Gavin Bullas	16 & 1	Ford Mustang	Rain City Racing	150	108	164	156	160	(45)	48	172	1003
3	John Bowe	18	Ford Mustang	WesTrac Cat	129	180	108	180	0	120	60	156	933
4	Andrew Miedecke	95	Chevrolet Camaro SS	WesTrac Cat	(168)	145	132	60	112	89	104	152	794
5	Leanne Tander	11	Ford XA Falcon GT	Phil Morris	24	133	123	125	135	100	0	120	760
6	Steve Mason	3	Chevrolet Camaro SS	Hercules Engines	135	36	0	98	123	100	104	70	666
7	Bill Pye	15	Chevrolet Camaro SS	Bill Pye	105	126	114	72	138	0	0	45	600
8	Brad Tilley	28	Ford XY Falcon GT	Tilleys Automotive	142	36	145	148	0	0	0	99	570
9	Graham Alexander	57	Holden HT Monaro	Corio Auto Parts	69	120	51	120	54	78	39	0	531
10	Brett Youlden	56	Holden HQ Monaro	Driving Force / Rare Spares	30	63	0	93	142	98	90	0	516
11	Mark King	8	Holden HQ SS	Waddington Racing / Kings Springs	30	92	0	72	120	45	84	66	509
12	George Nittis	83	Ford XY Falcon GTHO	Ocean Seafoods	41	72	0	35	59	69	57	84	396
13	Matt O'Brien	27	Holden HQ Monaro	Australian Web Insurance	0	60	17	93	30	0	57	117	374
14	Alastair MacLean	14	Chevrolet Camaro SS	Dukes Body Works	117	60	87	0	33	0	0	0	297
15	Nigel Benson	22	Holden HQ Monaro	PRT Race Fabrication	45	21	75	57	30	0	45	0	273
16	Tony Hunter	10	Holden HQ Monaro	Sunliner RV	0	27	30	0	99	78	36	0	270
17	Tony Edwards	9	Holden HQ Monaro	Romac UPC / Competition Engineering	42	90	132	0	0	0	0	0	264
18	Steve Makarios	99	Ford XY Falcon GTHO	351 Motorsport	90	0	78	0	0	0	75	0	243
19	Doug Westwood	62	Ford XY Falcon GTHO	Falcon Fire Protection	27	0	99	46	24	0	0	33	229
20	Michael Acheson	55	Chrysler VH Valiant Charger E55	Signwise Enterprises	0	0	0	0	48	0	54	93	195
21	Keith Kassulke	9	Holden HQ Monaro	Upstream Printing Solutuions	0	0	0	41	24	0	33	90	188
22	Bob Middleton	85	Chevrolet Camaro RS	Whiteline Transport Racing	0	0	57	21	75	0	21	0	174
23	Garry Treloar	20	Chevrolet Camaro	Treloar Roses	0	0	0	78	0	0	0	0	78
24	Elliot Barbour	74	Ford XY Falcon GTHO	Jenny Barbour & Associates	0	0	0	34	0	0	0	0	34
25	Wayne Mercer	74	Ford XY Falcon GTHO	Lyndways Builders	0	0	0	0	0	0	21	0	21
Group 2													
Position	Driver	No.	Car	Competitor / Team	Ade	Win	Hid	Eas	Bat	Sym	San	Hom	Total
1	Bernie Stack	36	Porsche 911 RS	Gawler Body Works	180	172	138	176	108	116	(101)	172	1062
2	Cameron Tilley	60	Chrysler Valiant Pacer	Tilleys Automotive	(48)	94	180	172	120	104	108	176	954
3	Chris Stillwell	6	Ford Mustang	Stillwell Motorsport	132	160	152	93	164	116	(60)	87	904
4	Ian McAlister	5	Ford Mustang	McAlister Ford	139	139	168	148	149	0	97	48	888
5	John Nelson	91	Porsche 911 RS	Nelson Architects	136	0	114	129	75	78	81	129	742
6	Gary O'Brien	19	Holden HQ SS	Panels & Performance	0	81	66	149	49	84	96	126	651
7	Greg Keene	33 & 26	Porsche 911 RS	SportsMed & Toshiba / Copyworld	99	93	72	0	126	0	102	156	648
8	Mick Wilson	43	Chrysler VH Valiant Charger R/T	Treloar Roses / Mick Wilson Plumbing	78	114	123	0	149	93	0	87	644
9	Rory O'Neill	13	Porsche 911 RS	The Wine Underground	126	78	0	111	102	72	72	75	636
10	Amanda Sparks	33	Porsche 911 RS	SportsMed	0	0	105	120	114	87	0	0	426
11	Trevor Talbot	76	Holden LJ Torana GTR XU-1	Dukes Body Works	56	116	145	0	42	0	0	0	359
12	Ross Almond	26	Porsche 911 RS	Toshiba / Copyworld	0	0	0	102	0	39	0	0	141
13	Garry Treloar	21	Chrysler VH Valiant Charger R/T	Treloar Roses	75	36	0	0	0	0	0	0	111
14	Graeme Cook	61	Porsche 911 RS	Racemoves / Buik Motorworks	164	-60	0	0	0	0	0	0	104
Group 3													
Position	Driver	No.	Car	Competitor / Team	Ade	Win	Hid	Eas	Bat	Sym	San	Hom	Total
1	Tony Karanfilovski	88	Alfa Romeo GTAm	TIFS - Wharehousing & Distribution	120	172	180	176	172	0	112	180	1112
2	Phillip Showers	4	Ford Escort RS1600	Northern BM P/L	168	176	(112)	172	172	120	120	168	1096
3	Cameron Mason	7	Datsun 510	Steve Mason Family Cars	0	0	0	52	160	112	104	104	532
4	Jason Humble	7	Datsun 510	Steve Mason	164	0	0	0	0	0	0	0	164

Note:

- Each driver was required to drop points from one round of the series. Points which were not retained are shown in the above table within brackets.
- Due to an engine irregularity, Andrew Miedecke nominated Adelaide as the round for which his points would be dropped.
