= 2011 Touring Car Masters =

Australian motor racing competition

Seasons
- ← 2010 2012 →

The 2011 Touring Car Masters was Australian motor racing competition for modified Touring Cars. The series was open to cars manufactured between 1 January 1963 and 31 December 1973 and to specific models manufactured between 1 January 1974 and 31 December 1976. It was sanctioned by the Confederation of Australian Motor Sport (CAMS) as a National Series and ‘Australian Classic Touring Cars’ was appointed by CAMS as the Category Manager. The series was the fifth annual Touring Car Masters.

John Bowe (Ford Mustang) won Class C, Gary O'Brien (Holden HQ Monaro GTS) was victorious in Class B and Amanda Sparks (Porsche 911 RS) secured the Class A award.

== Calendar ==
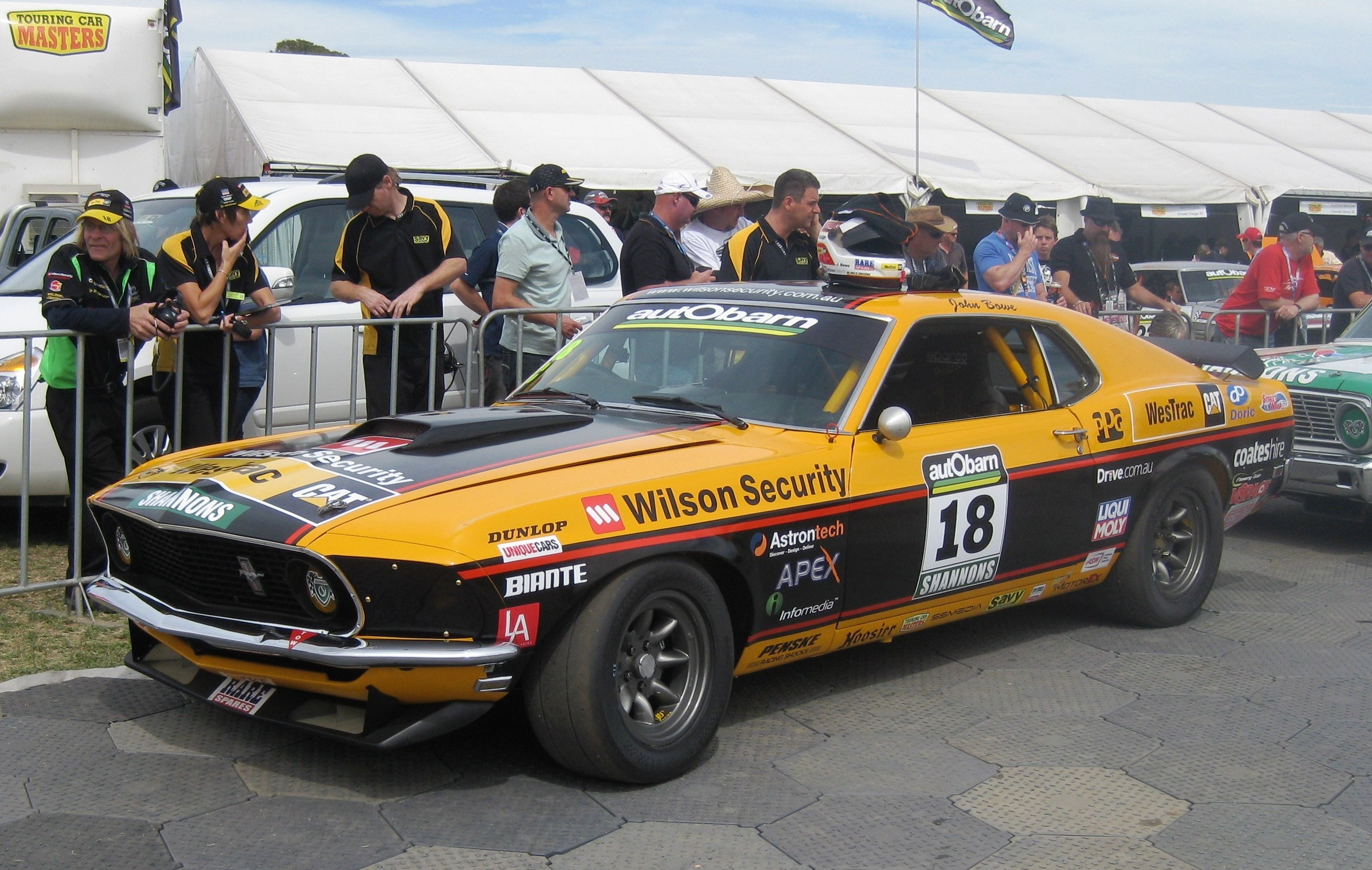
John Bowe (Ford Mustang) won Class C

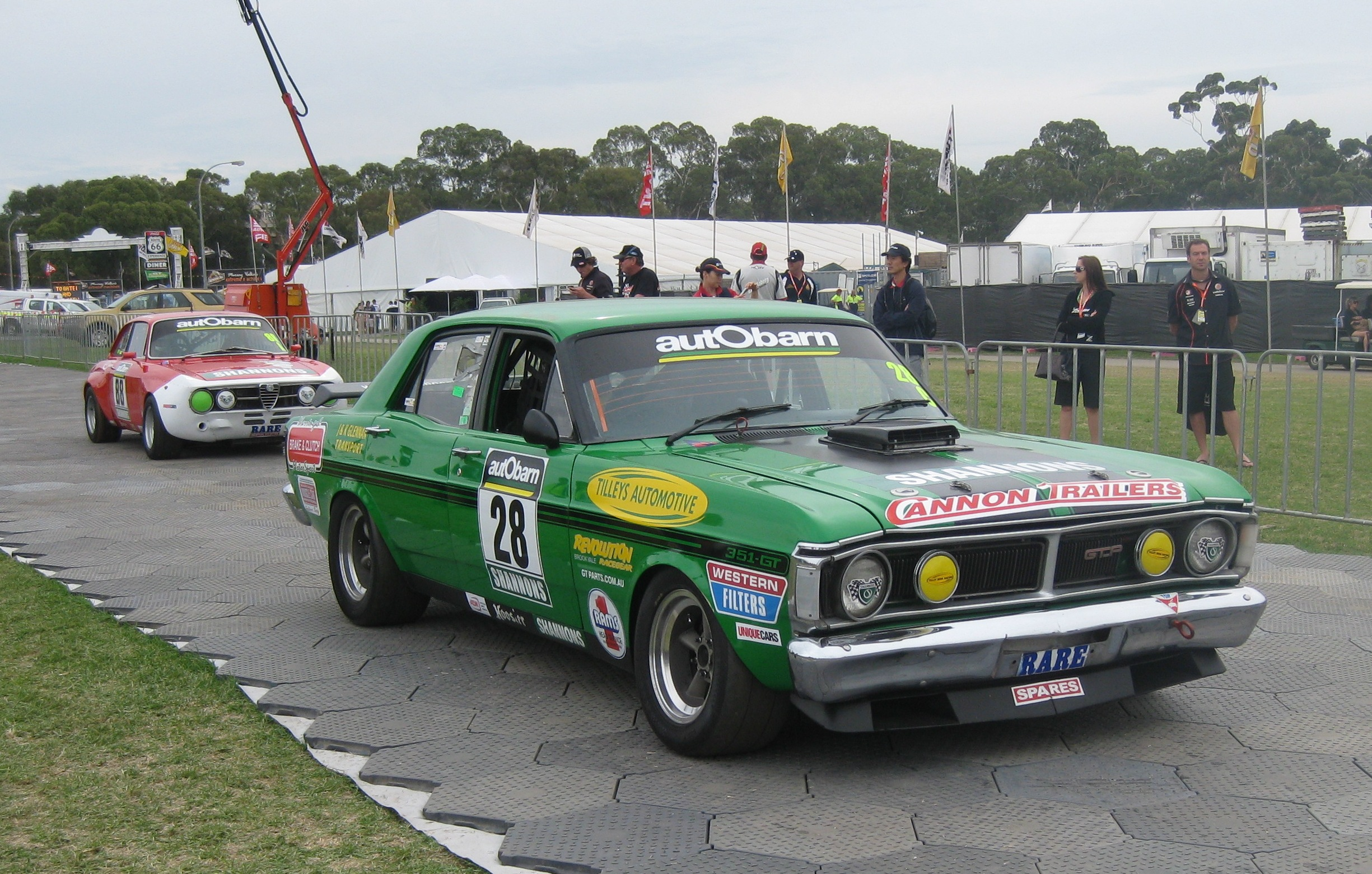
Brad Tilley (Ford XY Falcon GT) placed 4th in Class C

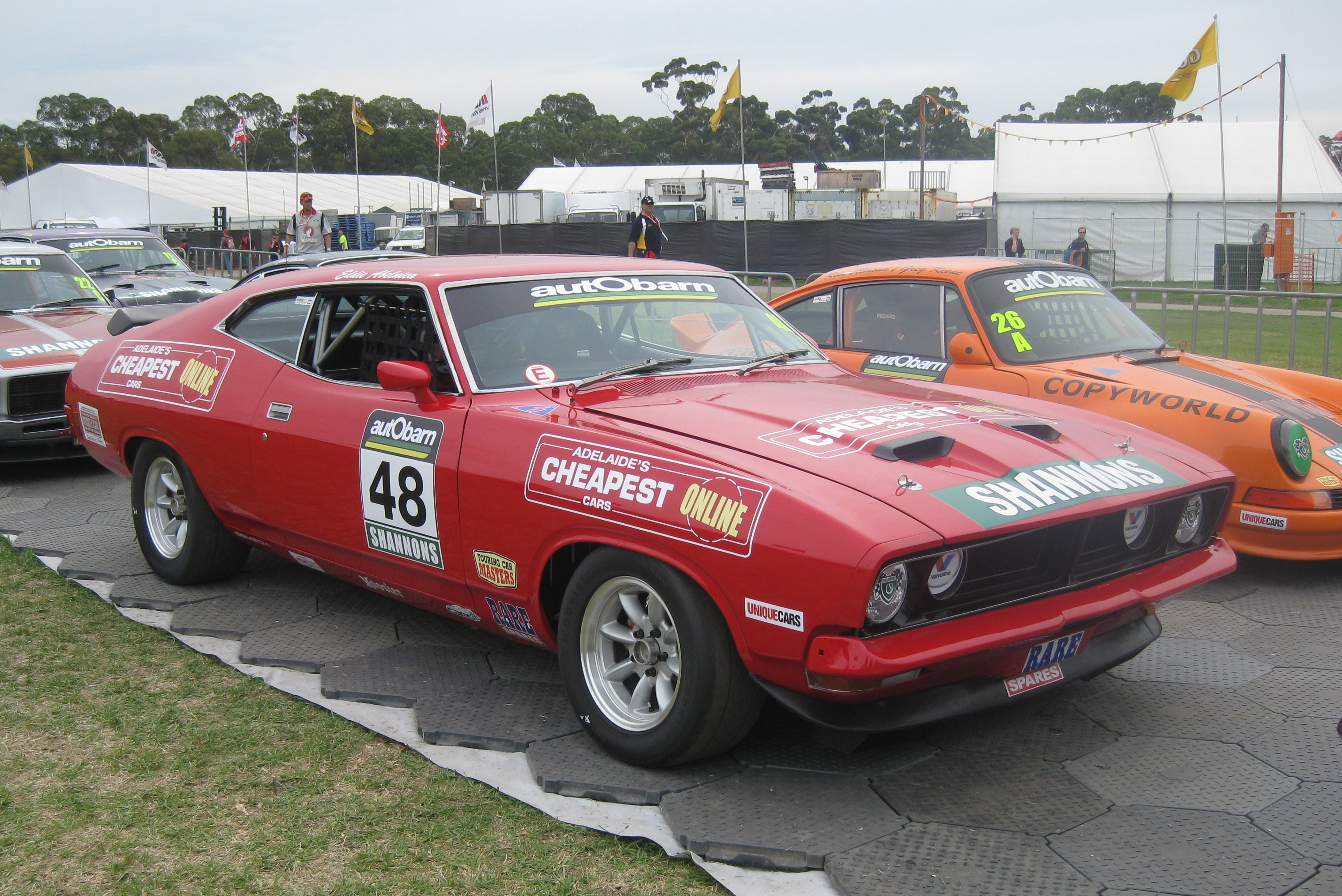
Eddie Abelnica (Ford XB Falcon Hardtop) placed 6th in Class C

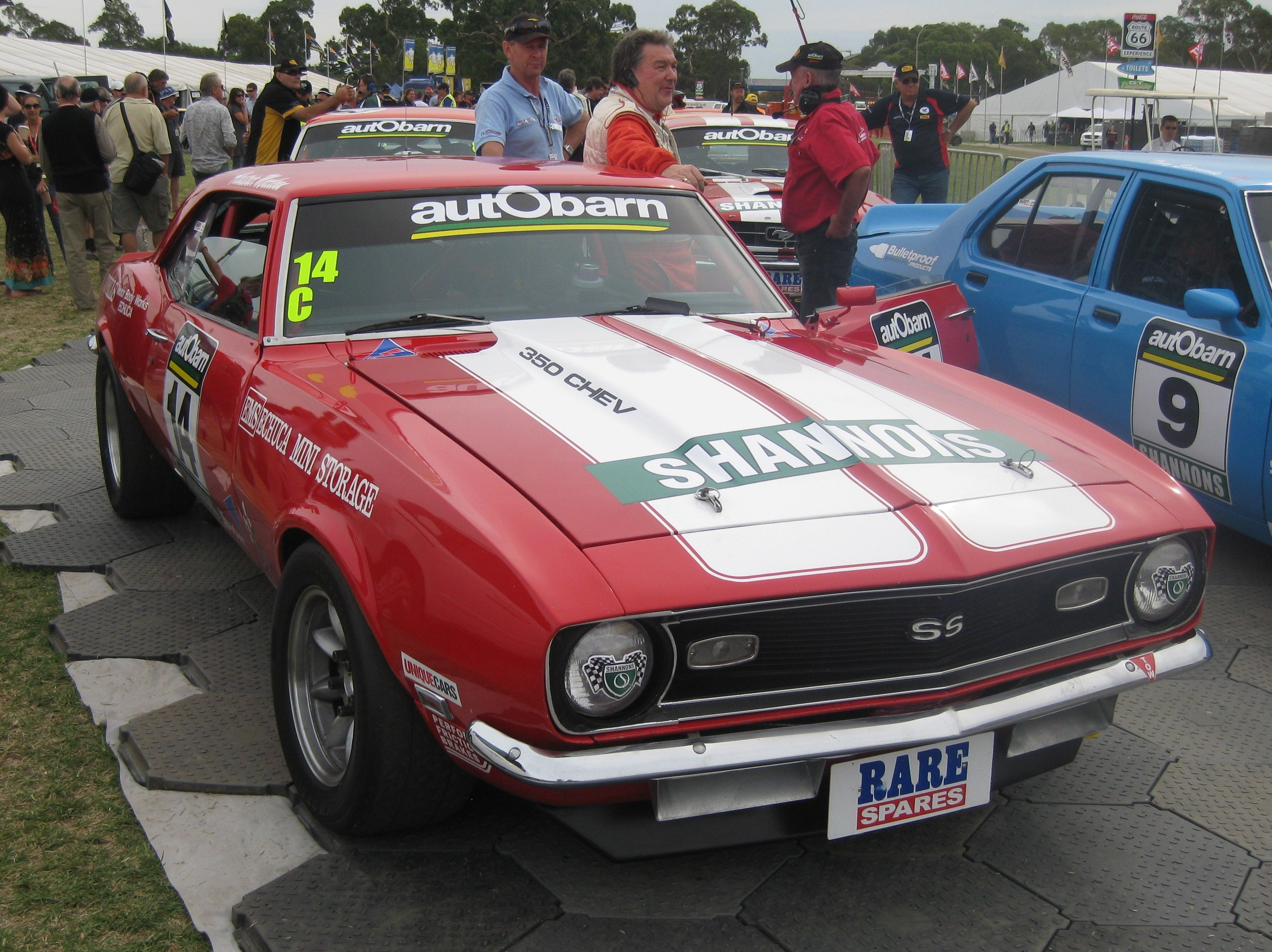
Alastair MacLean (Chevrolet Camaro SS) placed 14th in Class C

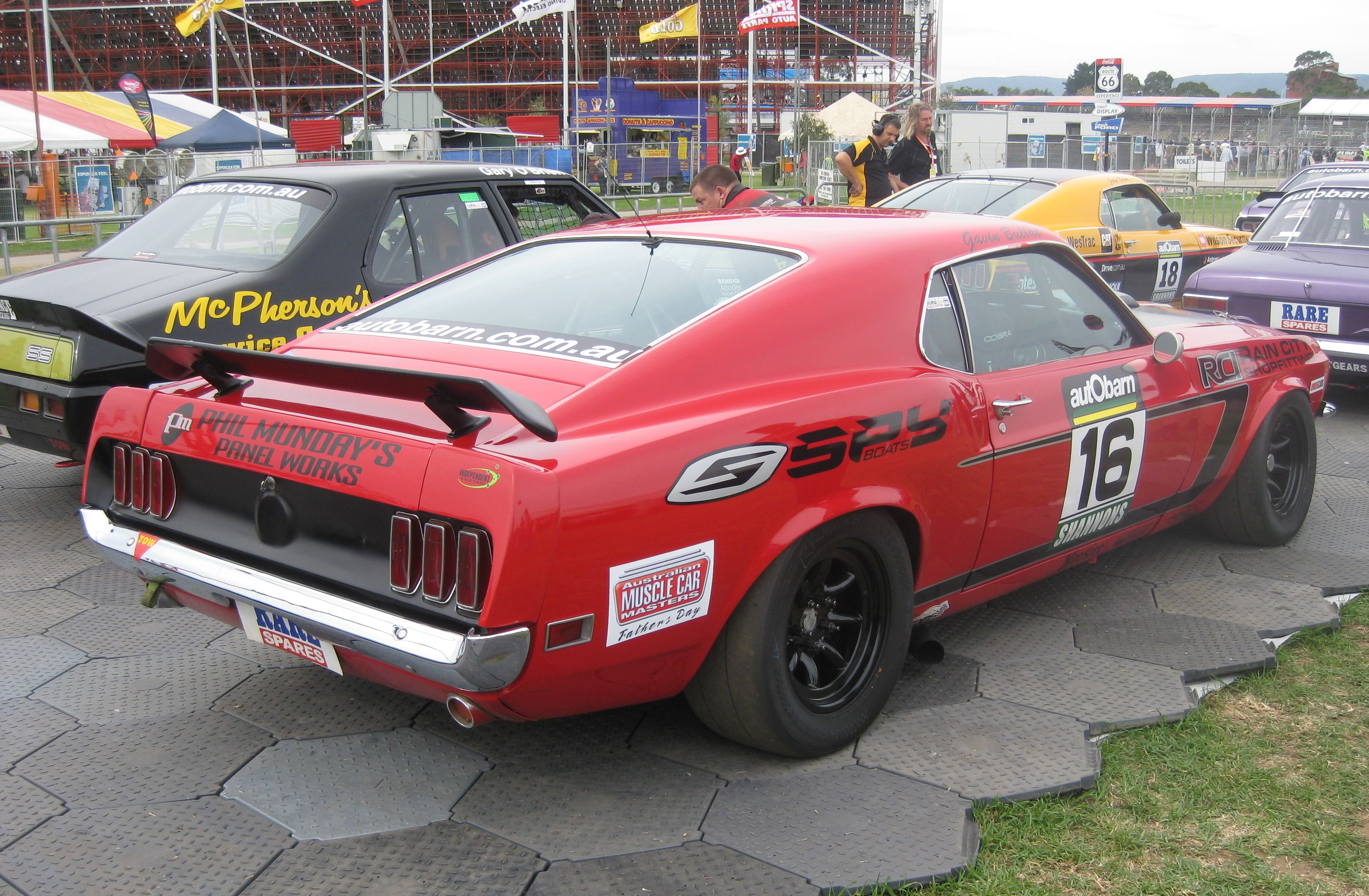
Gavin Bullas (Ford Mustang) placed 18th in Class C

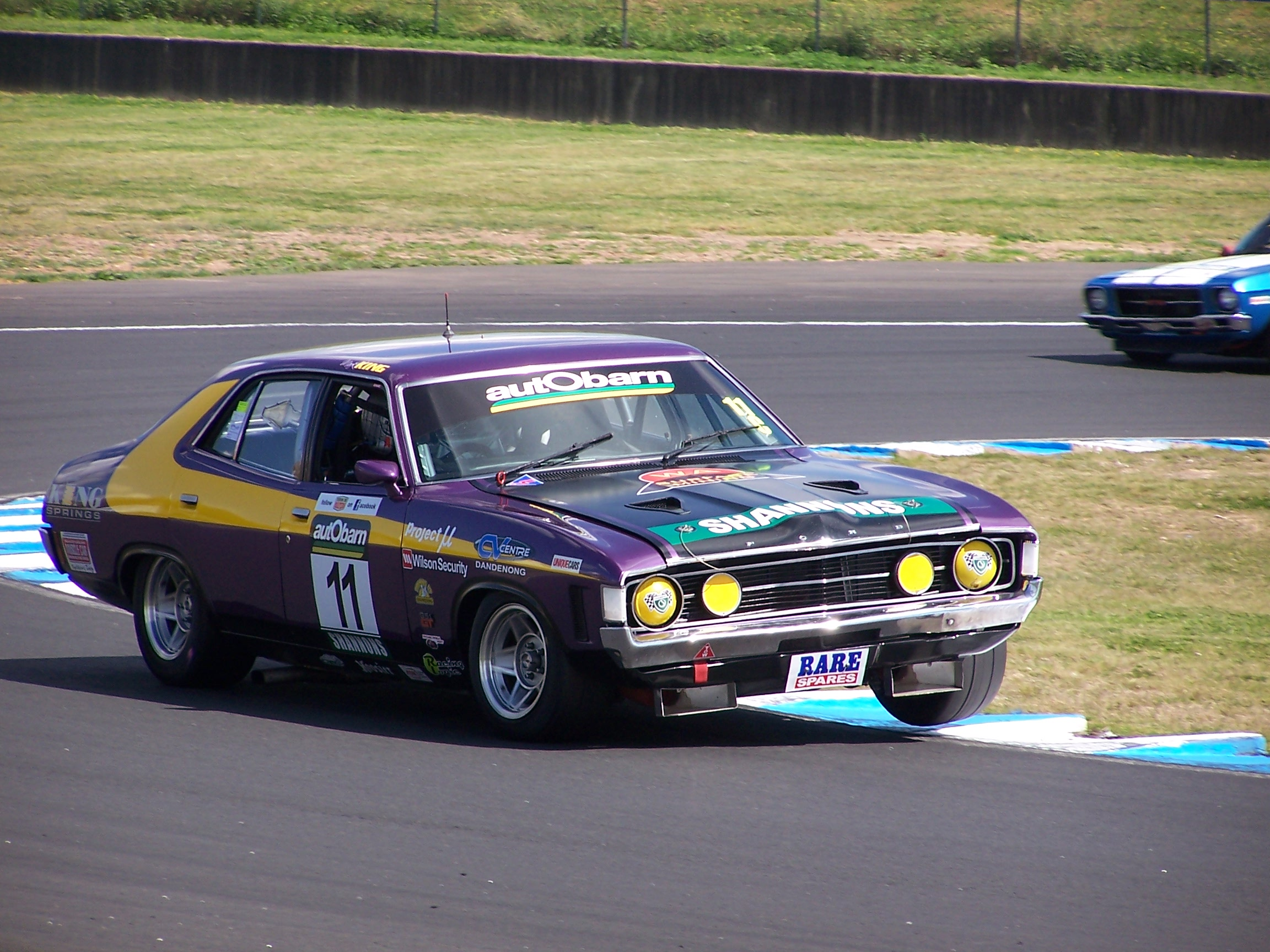
Mark King (Ford XA Falcon GT) placed 22nd in Class C

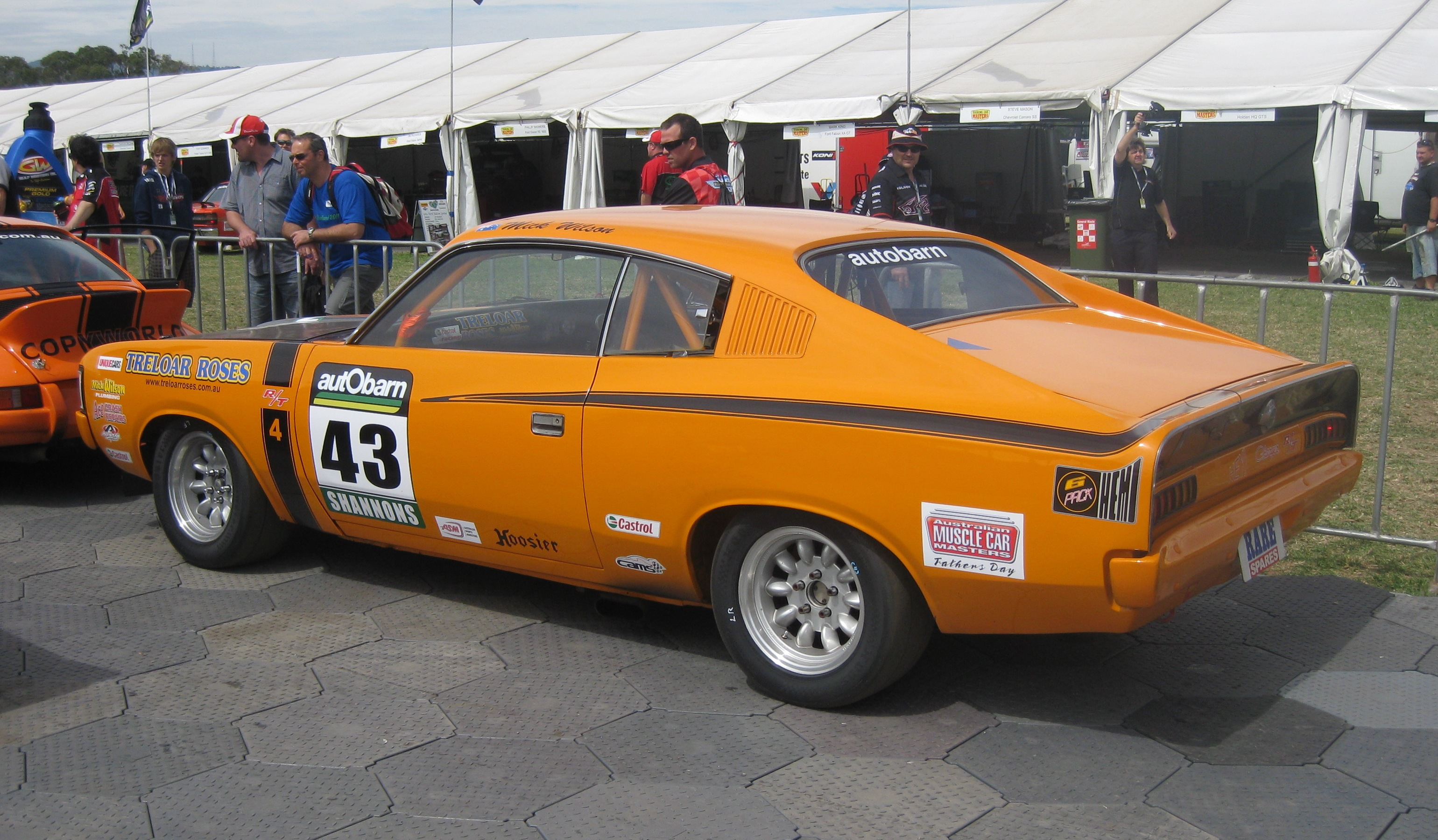
Mick Wilson (Chrysler VH Valiant Charger R/T placed 4th in Class B

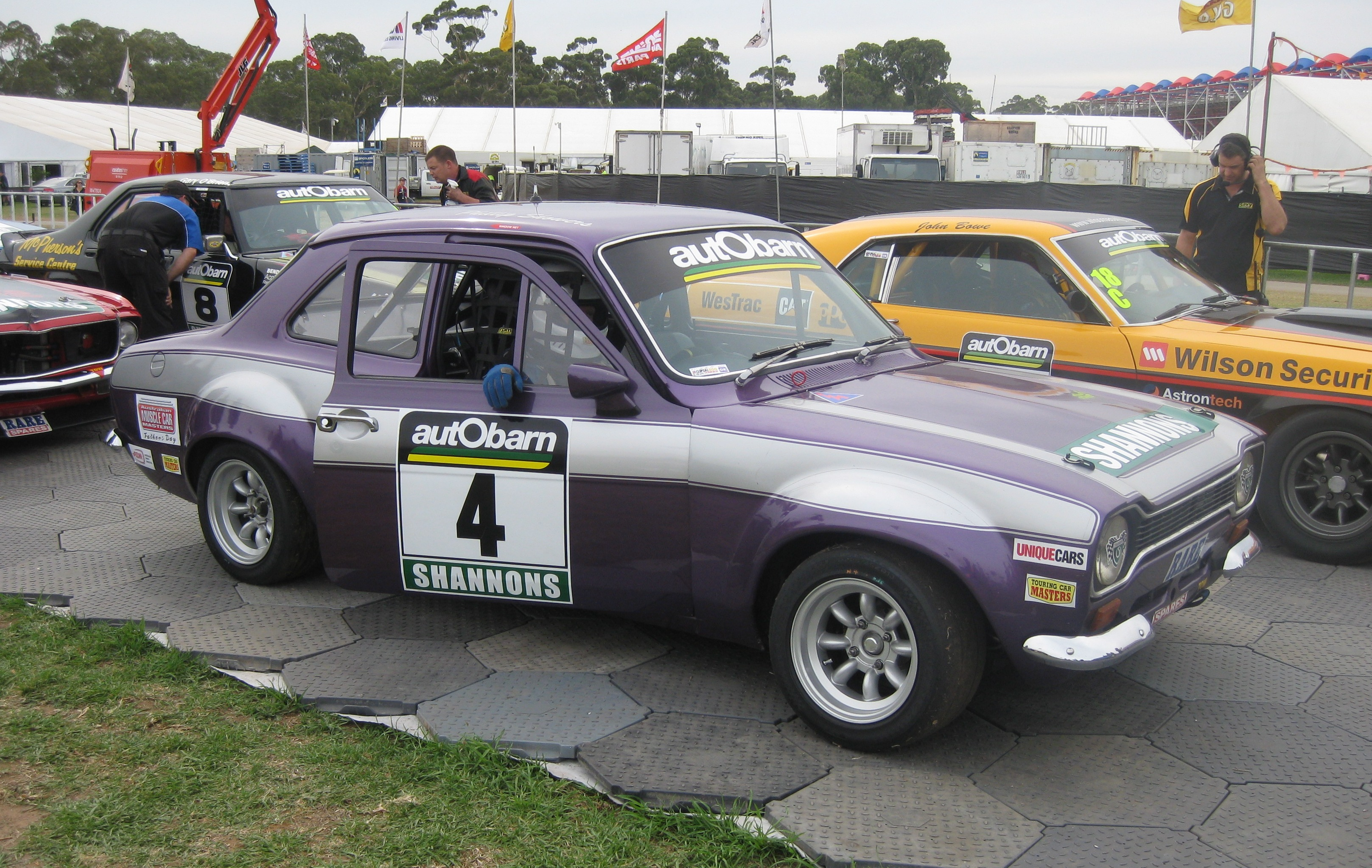
Phil Showers (Ford Escort) placed 7th in Class A

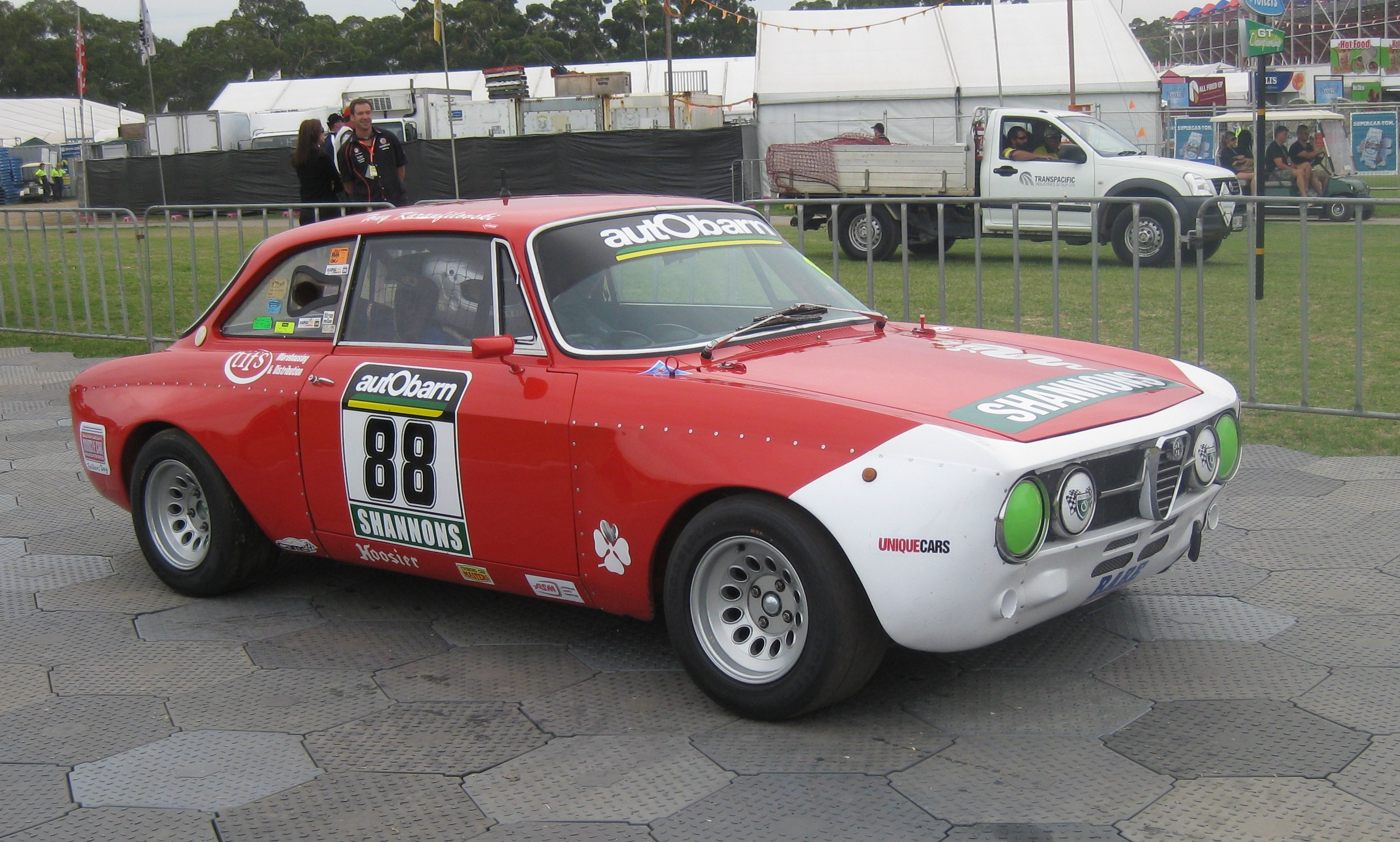
Tony Karanfilovski (Alfa Romeo GTAm) placed 8th in Class A

The series was contested over eight rounds.

Round	Circuit	Date	Format	Round winner	Car
1	Adelaide Parklands	17–20 March	Three races	John Bowe	Ford Mustang
2	Barbagallo Raceway	29 April - 1 May	Three races	John Bowe	Ford Mustang
3	Hidden Valley	17–19 June	Three races	Andrew Miedecke	Chevrolet Camaro SS
4	Eastern Creek	3–4 September	Three races	Andrew Miedecke	Chevrolet Camaro SS
5	Bathurst	6–9 October	Three races	Glenn Seton	Ford XB Falcon Hardtop
6	Gold Coast	21–23 October	Three races	John Bowe	Ford Mustang
7	Sandown	18–20 November	Three races	John Bowe	Ford Mustang
8	Homebush	2–4 December	Three races	Andrew Miedecke	Chevrolet Camaro SS

== Classes & points system ==
Each competing car was classified into one of three classes.

Series points were awarded on the following basis within each class at each race.

Position	1st	2nd	3rd	4th	5th	6th	7th	8th	9th	10th	11th	12th	13th	14th	15th	16th	17th	18th	19th	20th	21st	22nd	23rd	24th	25th	26th	27th	28th	29th	30th
Points	60	56	52	48	45	42	39	36	33	30	27	24	21	18	17	16	15	14	13	12	11	10	9	8	7	6	5	4	3	2

Bonus points were awarded to each race finisher equal to the number of cars that started a race within that class. E.g. If 14 cars started a race in Class B, then each car that finished within Class B was awarded an additional 14 bonus points for that race.

The driver gaining the highest points total from his/her best seven round results was declared the winner of that class.

Any points scored by a driver within a class were not transferred if that driver changed classes.

== Series standings ==
Class C											
Position	Driver	Car	Ade	Bar	Hid	Eas	Mou	Sur	San	Hom	Total
1	John Bowe	Ford Mustang	212	209	207	159	227	203	226	(155)	1443
2	Jim Richards	Ford Falcon Sprint	196	187	195	208	207	196	204	(148)	1393
3	Andrew Miedecke	Chevrolet Camaro SS	164	202	219	228	208	(126)	185	180	1386
4	Brad Tilley	Ford XY Falcon GT	201	124	186	176	188	0	39	148	1062
5	Keith Kassulke	Holden HQ Monaro	134	146	(99)	143	134	149	124	116.5	946.5
6	Eddie Abelnica	Ford XB Falcon Hardtop	198	109	0	188	194	180	0	0	779
7	Steve Mason	Chevrolet Camaro	190	0	97	179	182	86	38	0	772
8	Cameron Tilley	Chrysler Valiant Pacer; Ford Boss Mustang	144	164	0	130	152	46	107	147.5	753.5
9	Tony Karanfilovski	Ford XY Falcon GTHO	0	131	0	133	146	173	116	0	699
10	Tony Edwards	Holden Torana SL/R 5000	0	181	185	0	0	0	195	121	682
11	Glenn Seton	Ford XB Falcon Hardtop	0	0	0	175	227	0	0	174	576
12	Graham Alexander	Holden HT Monaro	0	0	0	0	134	149	167	109	559
13	George Nittis	Ford XY Falcon GT	122	116	43	115	10	0	0	0	506
14	Alastair MacLean	Chevrolet Camaro	155	128	0	0	0	0	173	0	456
15	Bill Pye	Chevrolet Camaro SS	0	96	166	147	37	0	0	0	446
16	Bernie Stack	Chevrolet Camaro RS	0	0	0	87	0	0	167	140.5	394.5
17	Doug Westwood	Ford XY Falcon GT	87	0	49	161	96	0	0	0	393
18	Gavin Bullas	Ford Boss Mustang	0	131	0	0	0	174	0	0	305
18	Brett Youlden	Holden HQ Monaro	0	0	0	137	152	0	0	0	289
20	John Woodberry	Holden HT Monaro	0	0	160	115	0	0	0	0	275
21	Matt O'Brien	Holden HQ Monaro	0	0	0	70	90	0	0	104.5	264.5
22	Mark King	Ford XA Falcon GT	105	0	148	0	0	0	0	0	253
23	Kim Jane	Ford XB Falcon Hardtop	0	0	0	0	0	0	202	0	202
24	Nigel Benson	Holden HQ Monaro	87	0	0	0	70	0	0	0	157
25	Paul Freestone	Holden HQ Monaro	0	0	0	0	0	0	146	0	146
26	Greg Waddington	Holden HQ Monaro	0	0	124	0	0	0	0	0	124
27	Garry Treloar	Chrysler Valiant Charger E55	0	0	0	35	0	88	0	0	123
28	Les Walmsley	Ford XA Falcon GT	0	0	0	0	0	0	89	0	89
29	Drew Marget	Holden HQ Monaro	0	0	0	0	0	0	76	0	76
30	Terry Wyhoon	Ford XY Falcon GTHO	0	0	0	0	0	61	0	0	61
31	Elliot Barbour	Chrysler Valiant Charger E55	0	0	0	37	0	0	0	0	37
32	Tony Hunter		0	0	0	0	0	0	0	0	0
Class B											
Position	Driver	Car	Ade	Bar	Hid	Eas	Mou	Sur	San	Hom	Total
1	Gary O'Brien	Holden HQ Monaro GTS	191	159	170	187	(66)	178	186	149	1220
2	Ian McAlister	Ford Mustang	183	0	182	175	189	123	171	159	1182
3	Andrew Whiteside	Ford Mustang	106	171	111	171	169	0	0	0	728
4	Mick Wilson	Chrysler VH Valiant Charger R/T	175	106	0	0	185	0	156	0	622
5	Trevor Talbot	Holden Torana GTR XU-1	0	112	186	0	0	178	99	0	575
6	Chris Stillwell	Ford Mustang	0	194	0	122	101	0	120	0	537
7	Wayne Mercer	Ford XY Falcon GT	153	0	103	103	51	0	0	0	410
8	Nigel Benson	Holden HQ Monaro	0	0	0	0	0	0	186	139	325
9	Bernie Stack	Chevrolet Camaro RS	0	179	0	0	0	0	0	0	179
Class A											
Position	Driver	Car	Ade	Bar	Hid	Eas	Mou	Sur	San	Hom	Total
1	Amanda Sparks	Porsche 911 RS	194	162	175	192	167	187	185	(158)	1260
2	John Nelson	Porsche 911 RS	120	186	167	168	183	179	169	(166)	1172
3	Greg Keene	Porsche 911 RS	182	174	183	180	195	0	185	64	1163
4	Rory O'Neill	Porsche 911 RS	170	152	153	104	150	171	0	140	1040
5	Terry Lawlor	Porsche 911 RS	0	130	180	0	0	0	0	0	310
6	Mark Buik	Porsche 911 RS	0	0	0	0	163	0	0	0	163
7	Phil Showers	Ford Escort	153	0	0	0	0	0	0	0	153
8	Tony Karanfilovski	Alfa Romeo GTAm	99	0	0	0	0	0	0	0	99
9	Ross Almond	Porsche 911 RS	0	0	0	0	0	0	57	0	57
