= Chrysler Valiant (VG) =

Australian full-size car

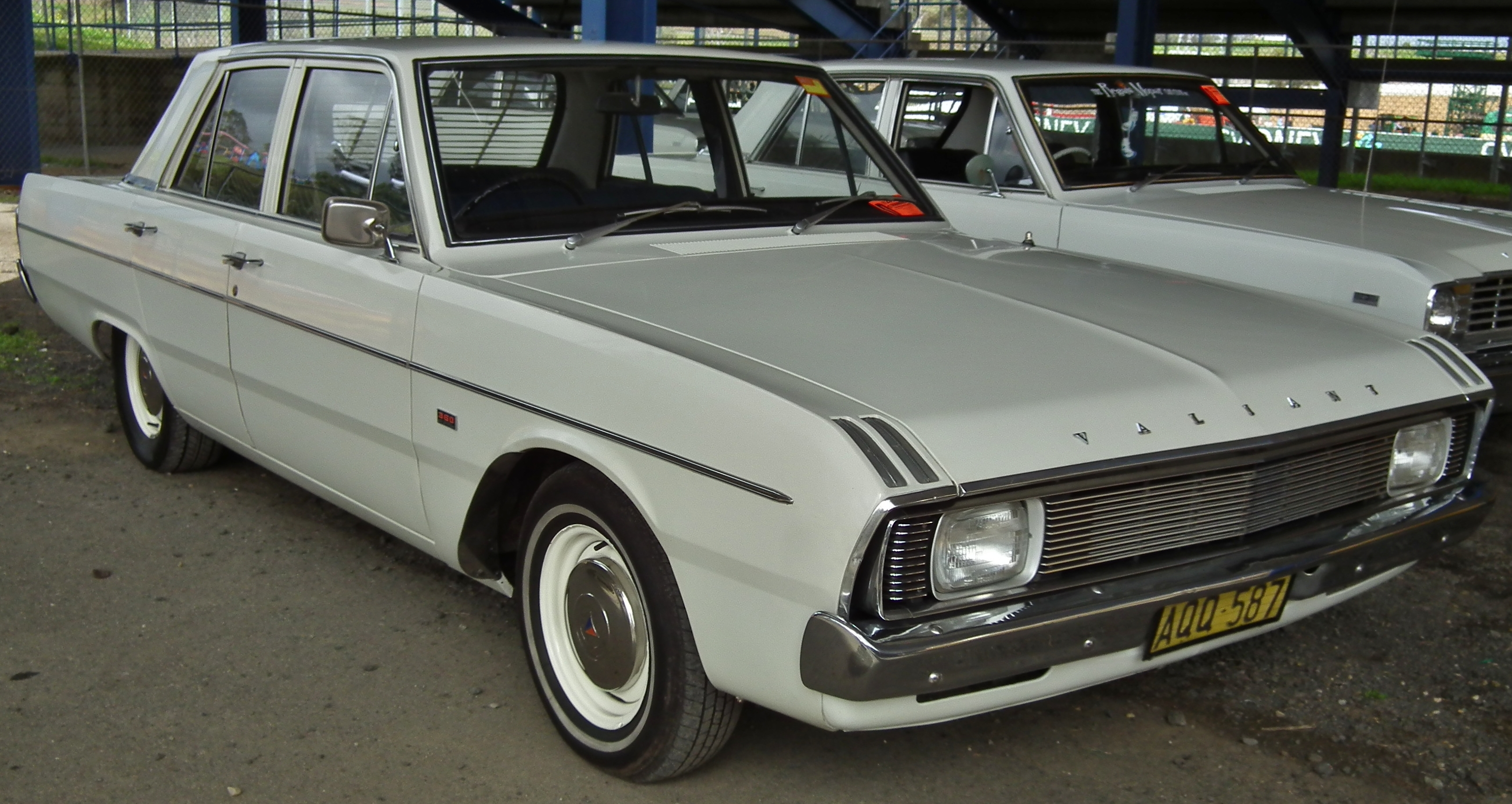
- Chrysler Valiant sedan

Overview
- Manufacturer: Chrysler Australia
- Also called: Dodge Utility
- Production: March 1970 – May 1971; 52,944 produced
- Assembly: Australia: Tonsley Park; New Zealand: Petone (Todd Motors)

Body and chassis
- Body style: 4-door sedan 2-door hardtop 5-door station wagon 2-door coupe utility
- Layout: FR layout
- Related: Chrysler VIP (VG)

Powertrain
- Engine: 215 cu in (3.5 L) I6; 225 cu in (3.7 L) I6; 245 cu in (4.0 L) I6; 318 cu in (5.2 L) V8
- Transmission: 3-speed manual 3-speed automatic

Dimensions
- Wheelbase: 108 inches (2743 mm); 111 inches (2819 mm) (Hardtop)

Chronology
- Predecessor: Chrysler Valiant (VF)
- Successor: Chrysler Valiant (VH)

The Chrysler Valiant (VG) is an automobile which was produced by Chrysler Australia from 1970 to 1971. It was the eighth Chrysler Valiant model to be produced in Australia.

== Overview ==
The Valiant VG was a mildly facelifted version of the Valiant VF with a restyled front grille and rectangular headlights. Sedans were also given restyled horizontal taillights.

Chrysler Australia continued to a produce a station wagon in the VG range, marketed as the "Safari Wagon."

Rear end styling on the utility remained virtually the same for the third consecutive model series.

From the A-pillar back, the two-door hardtop remained the same as the VF Valiant/U.S Dodge Dart.

The VG range featured a newly introduced Australian built "Hemi" six cylinder engine which was claimed by Chrysler to be the most advanced engine of its kind in the world.

== Model range ==
The Valiant (VG) was offered in 4-door sedan, 2-door hardtop, 5-door station wagon and 2-door coupe utility models.

- Valiant sedan (VG-M41)
- Valiant hardtop (VG-M23)
- Valiant Safari wagon (VG-M45)
- Valiant Pacer sedan (VG-S41)
- Valiant Pacer hardtop (VG-S23)
- Valiant Regal sedan (VG-H41)
- Valiant Regal hardtop (VG-H23)
- Valiant Regal Safari wagon (VG-H45)
- Valiant Regal 770 sedan (VG-H41 shared with Regal)
- Valiant Regal 770 hardtop (VG-H23 shared with Regal)
- Valiant Wayfarer utility (VG-L20)

Coupe utilities again used the previous VE series rear end styling with updated front end.

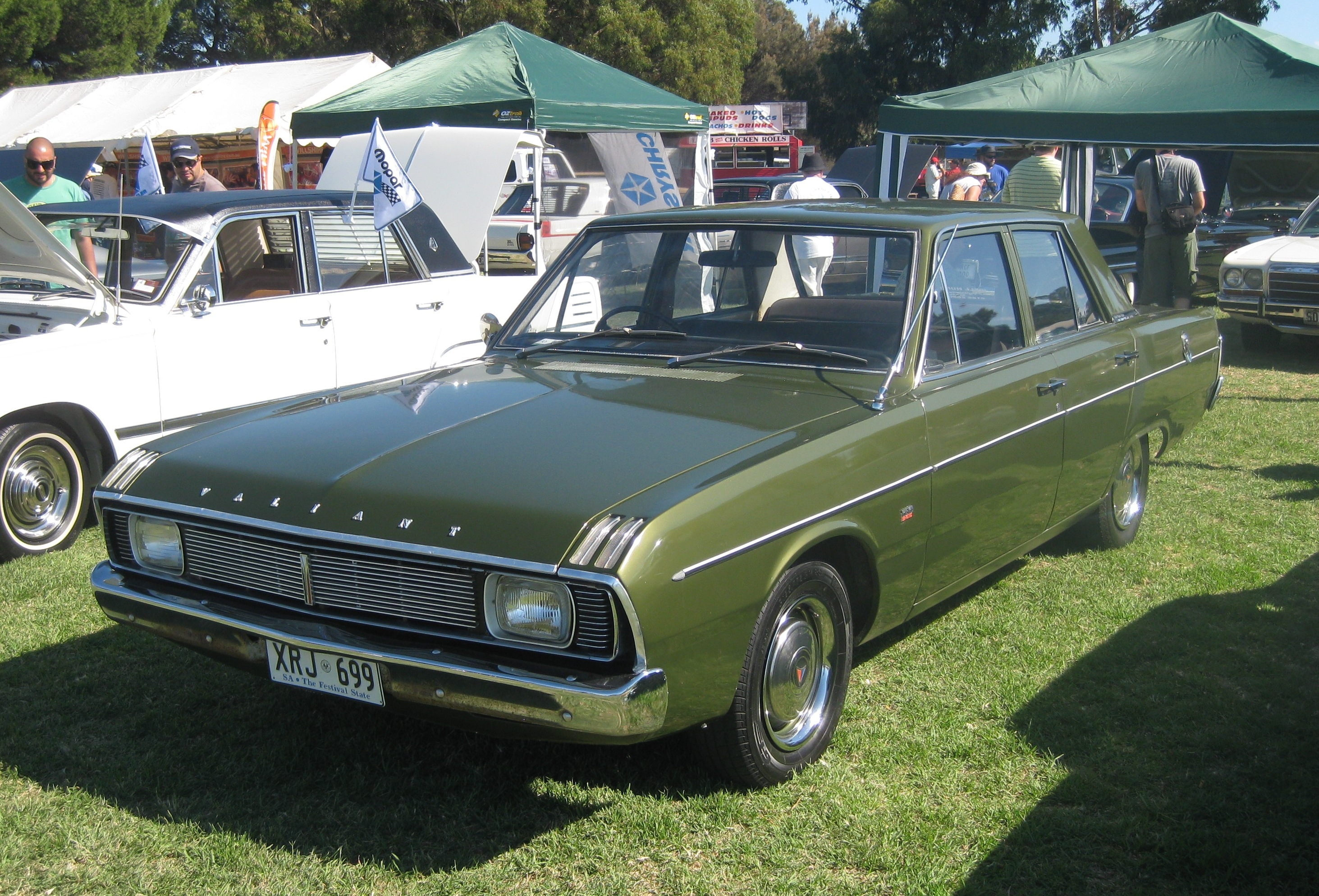
Chrysler VG Valiant sedan

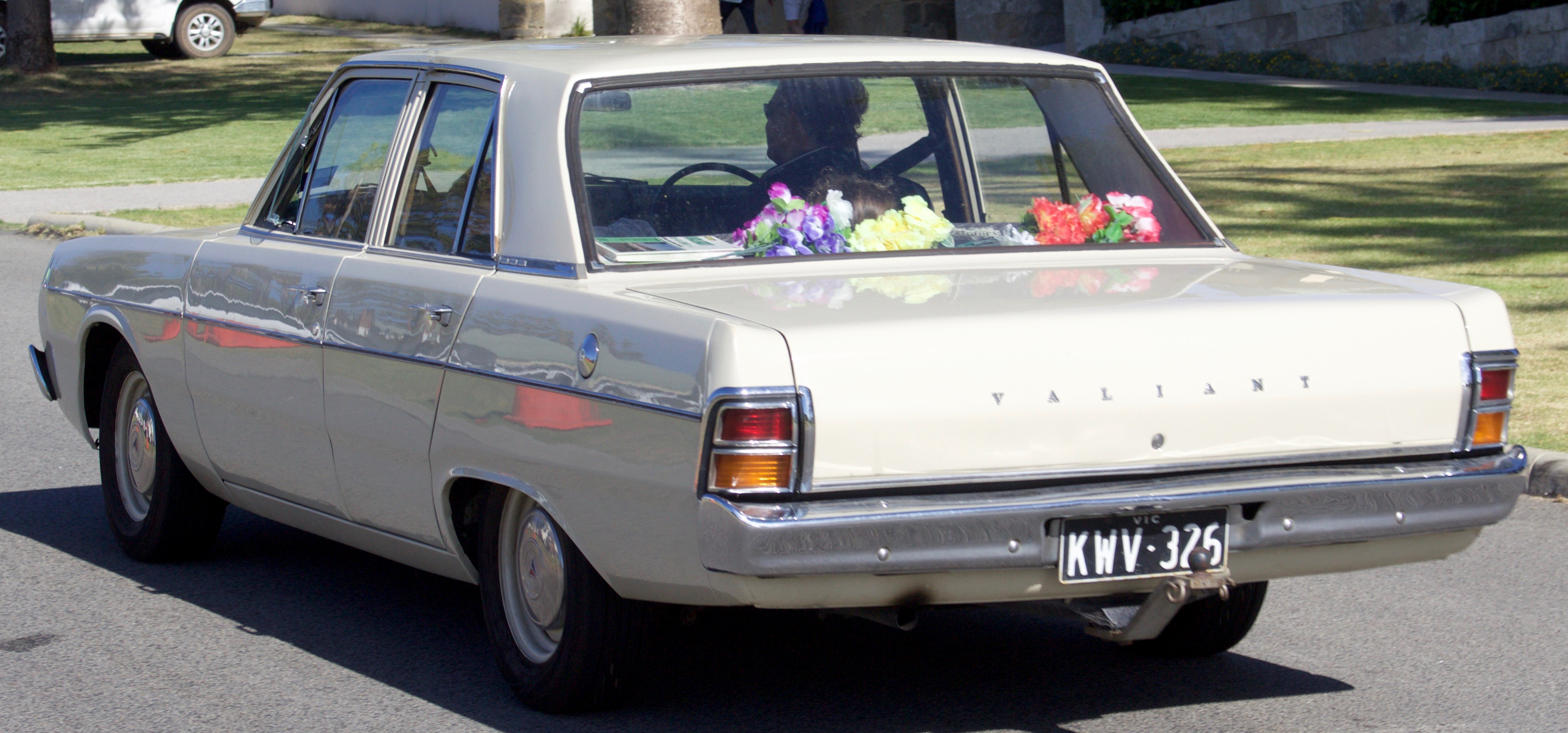
Chrysler VG Valiant sedan

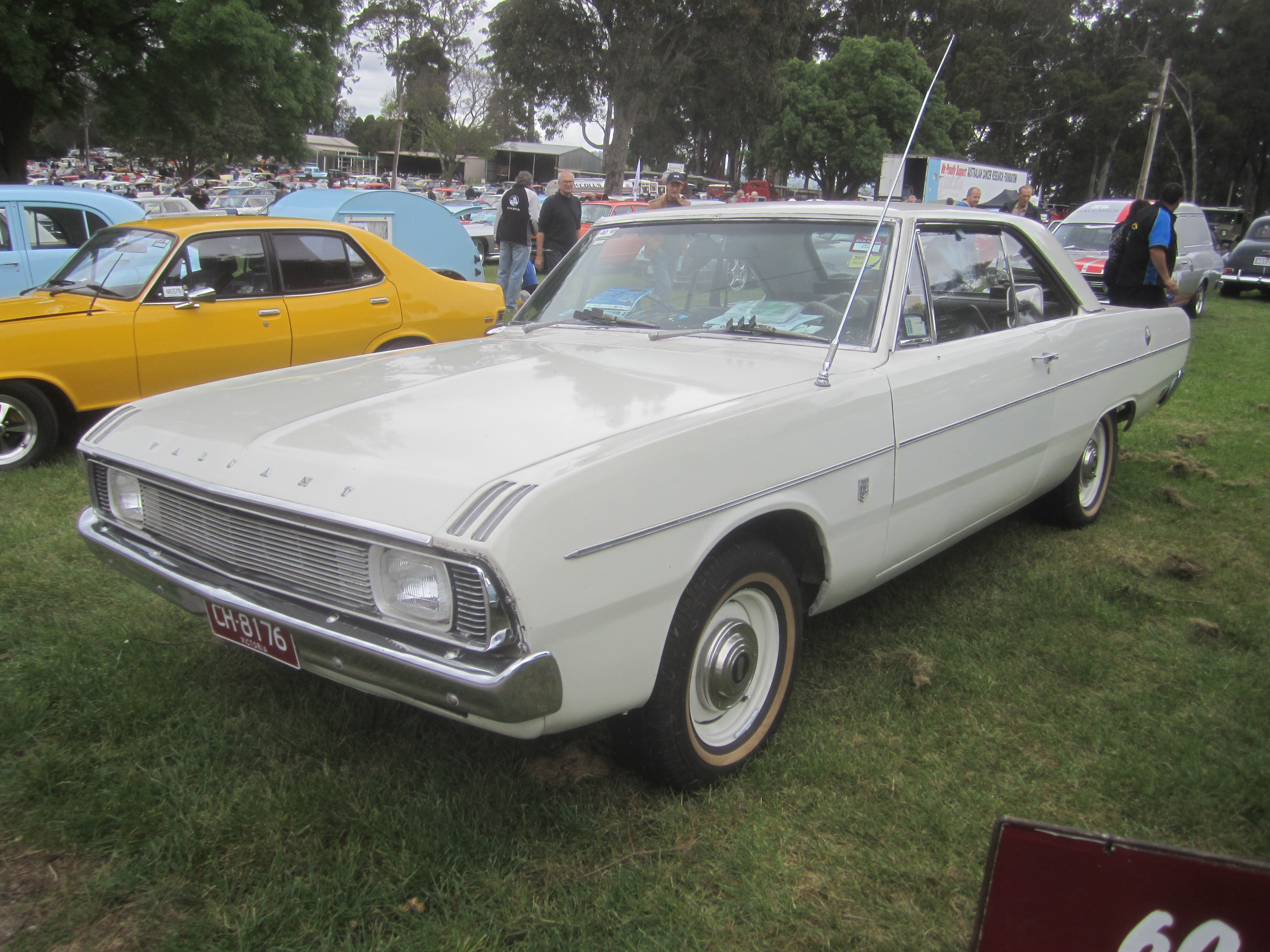
Chrysler VG Valiant hardtop

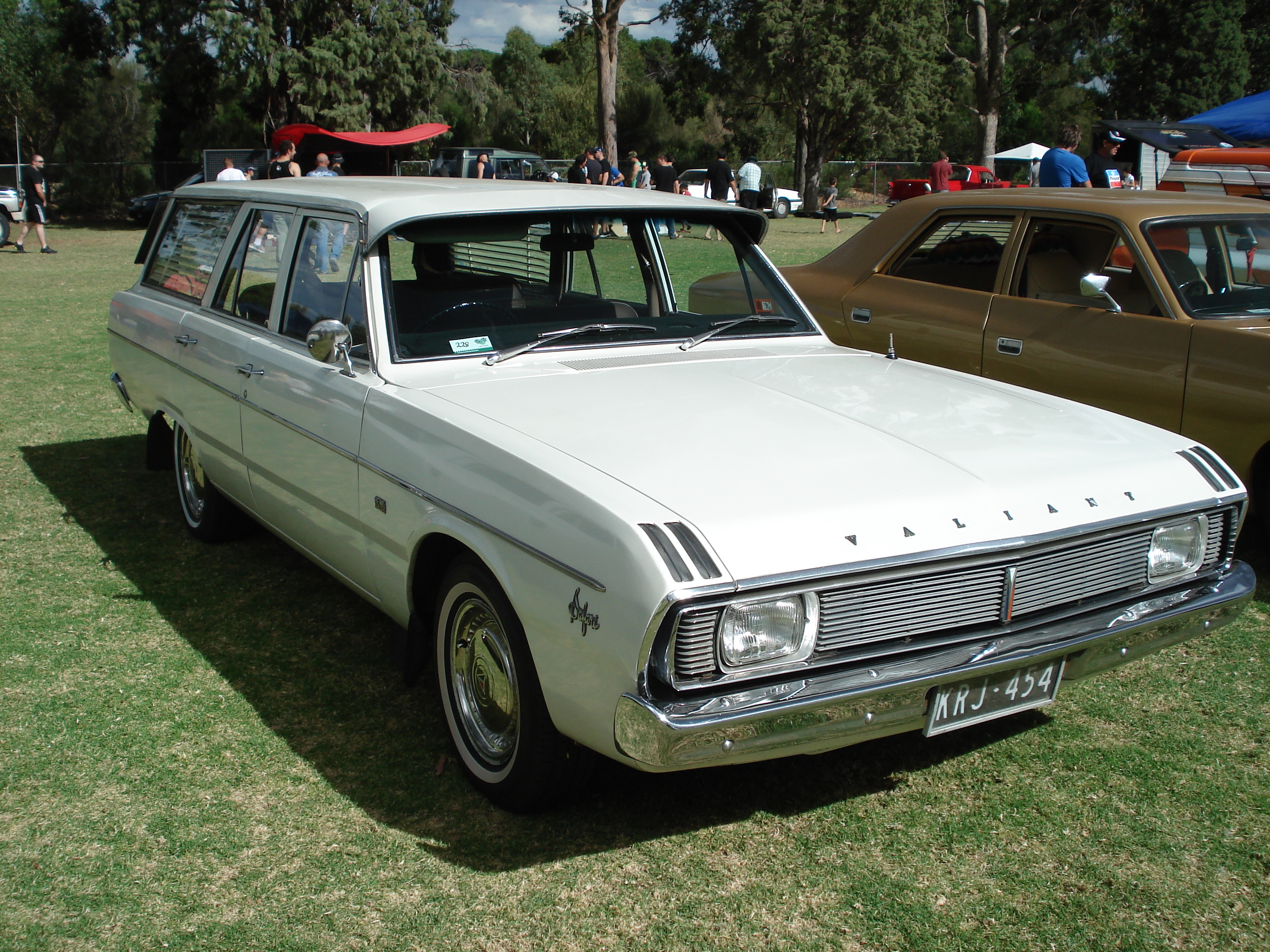
Chrysler VG Valiant Safari wagon

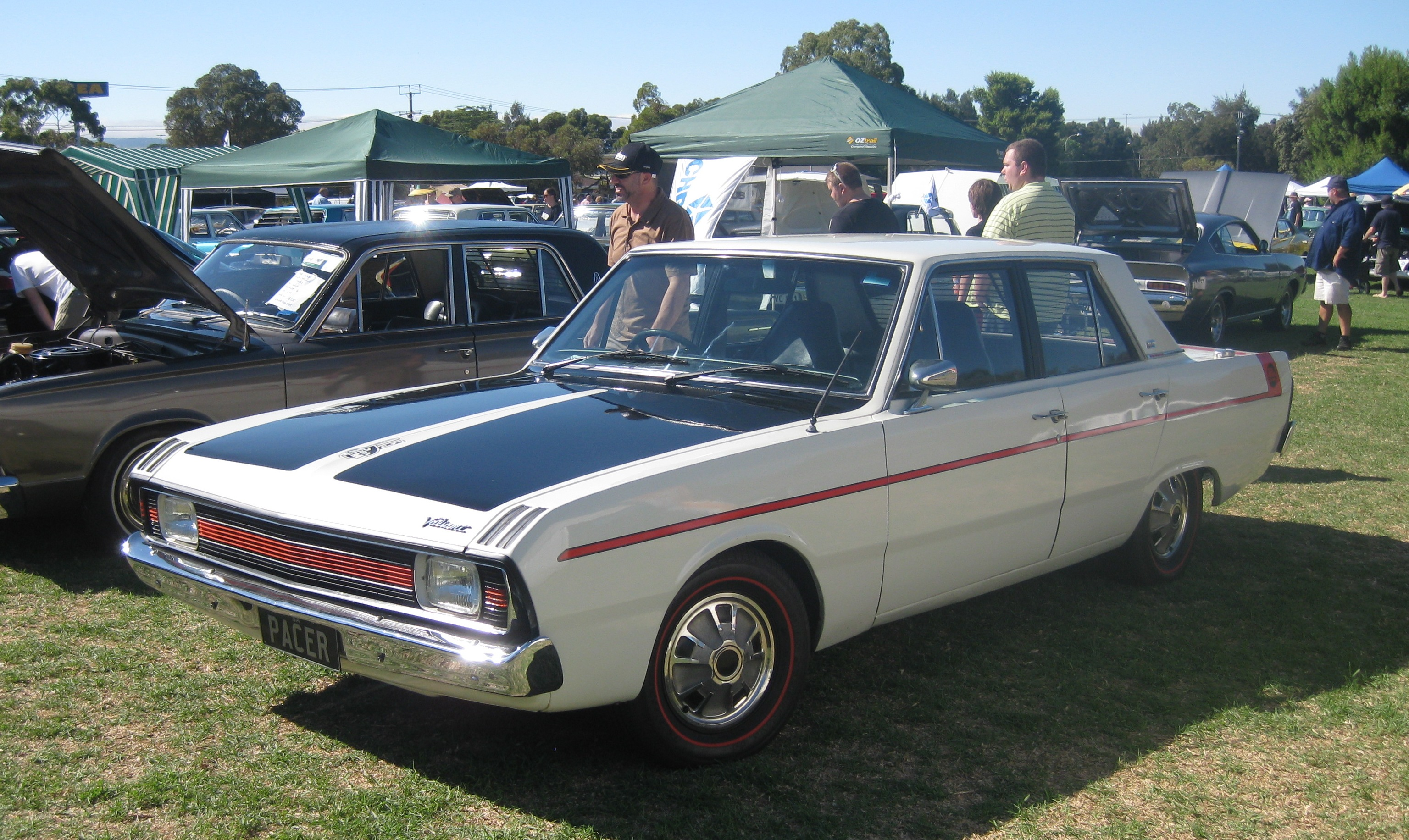
Chrysler VG Valiant Pacer sedan

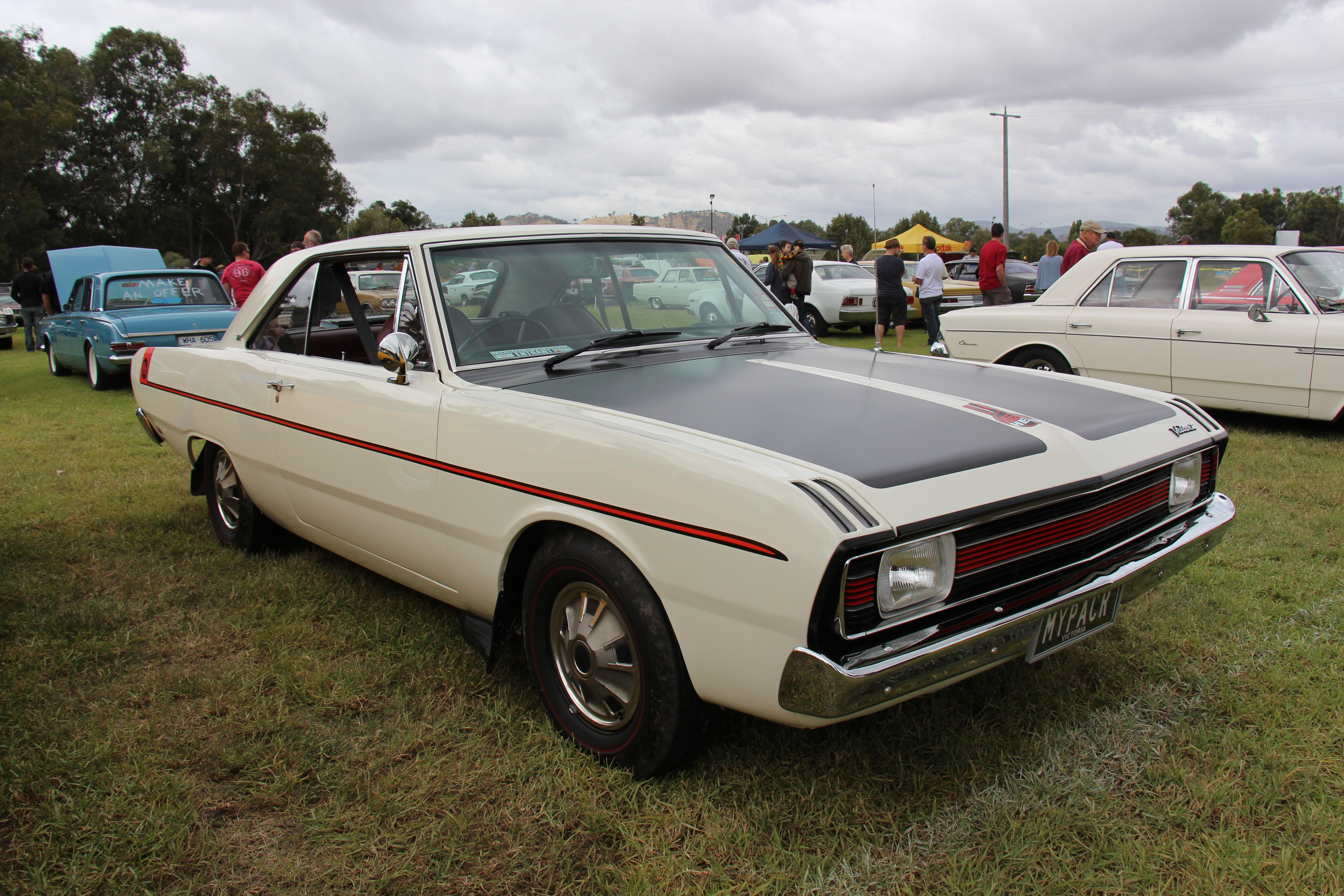
Chrysler VG Valiant Pacer hardtop

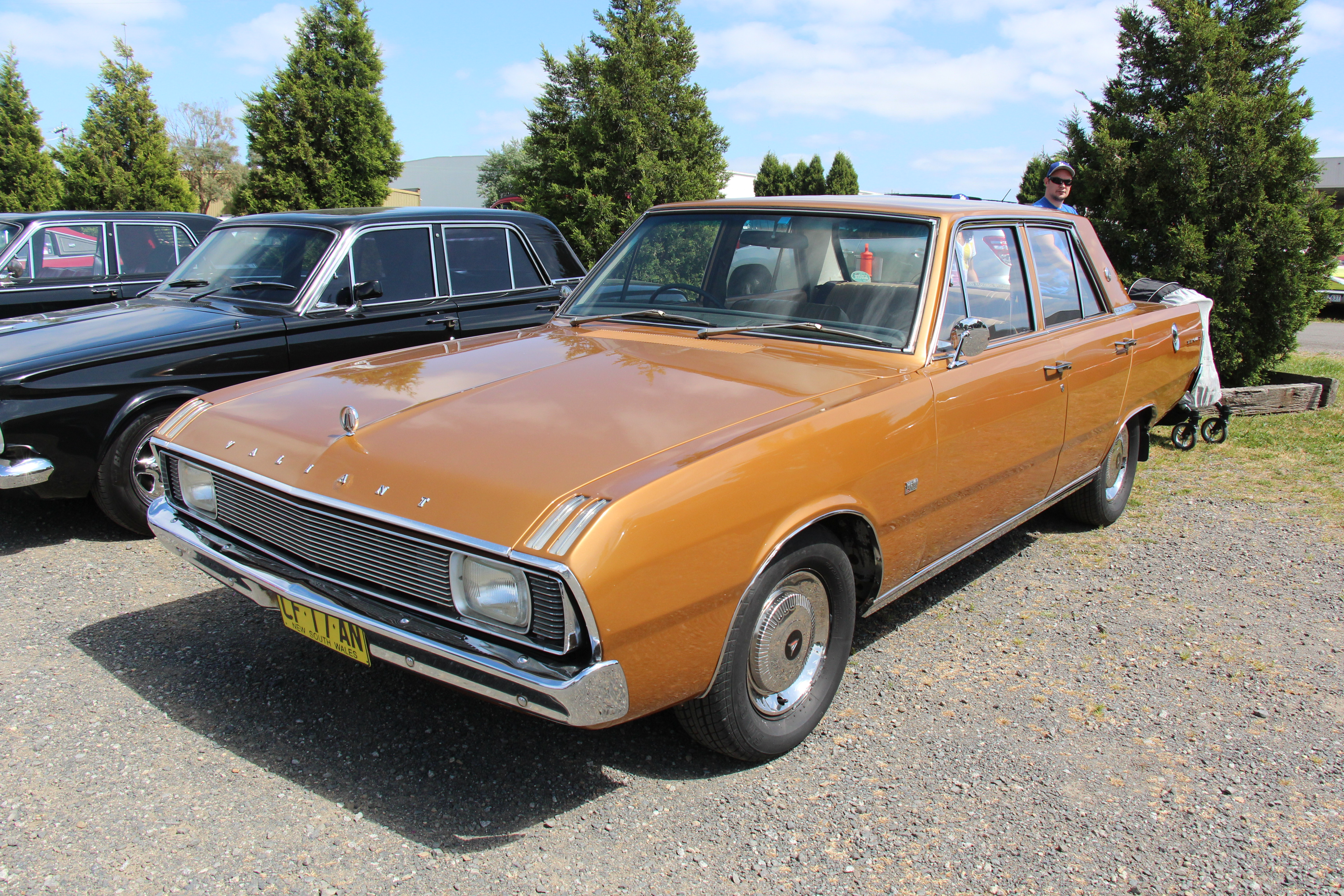
Chrysler VG Valiant Regal sedan

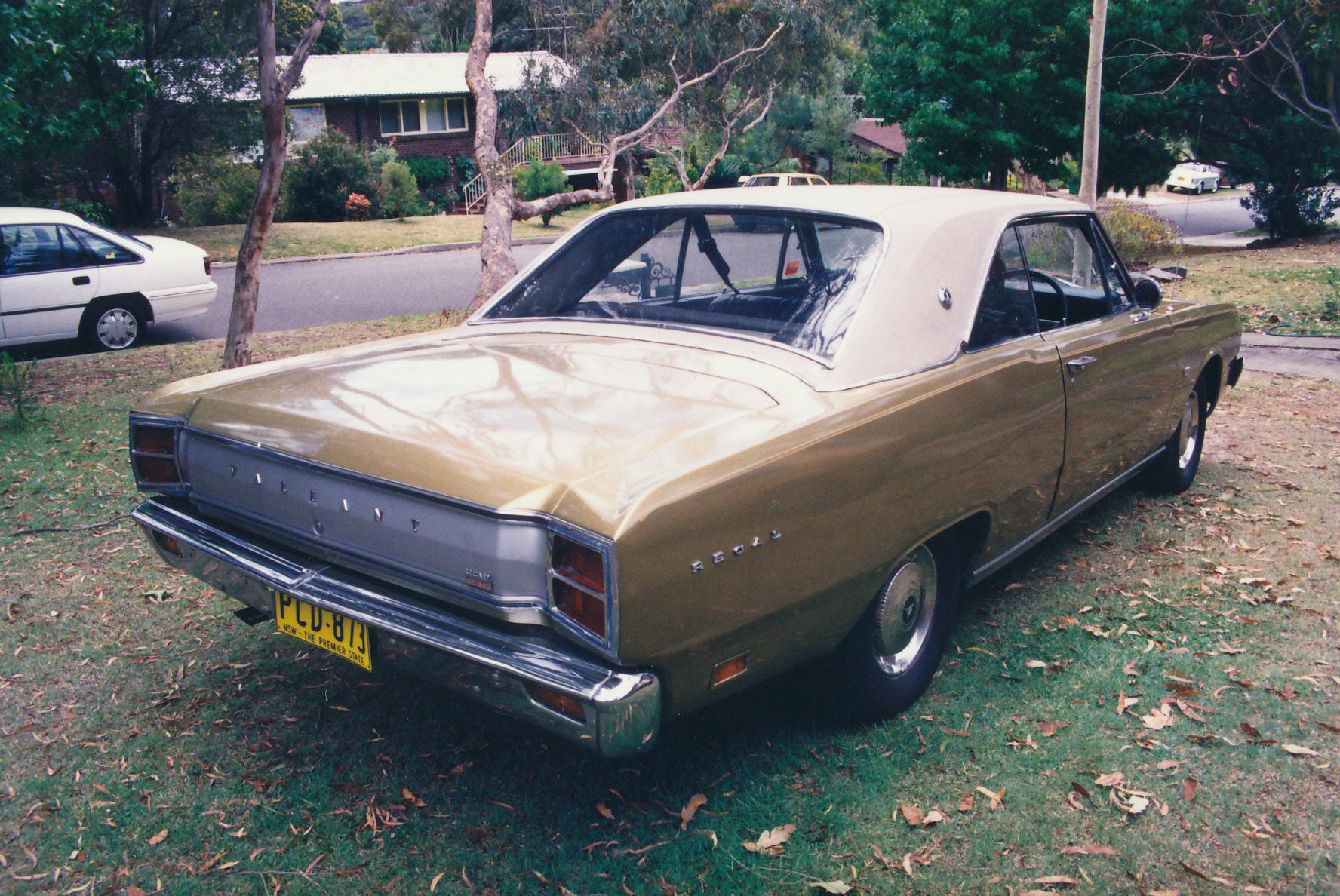
Chrysler VG Valiant Regal hardtop

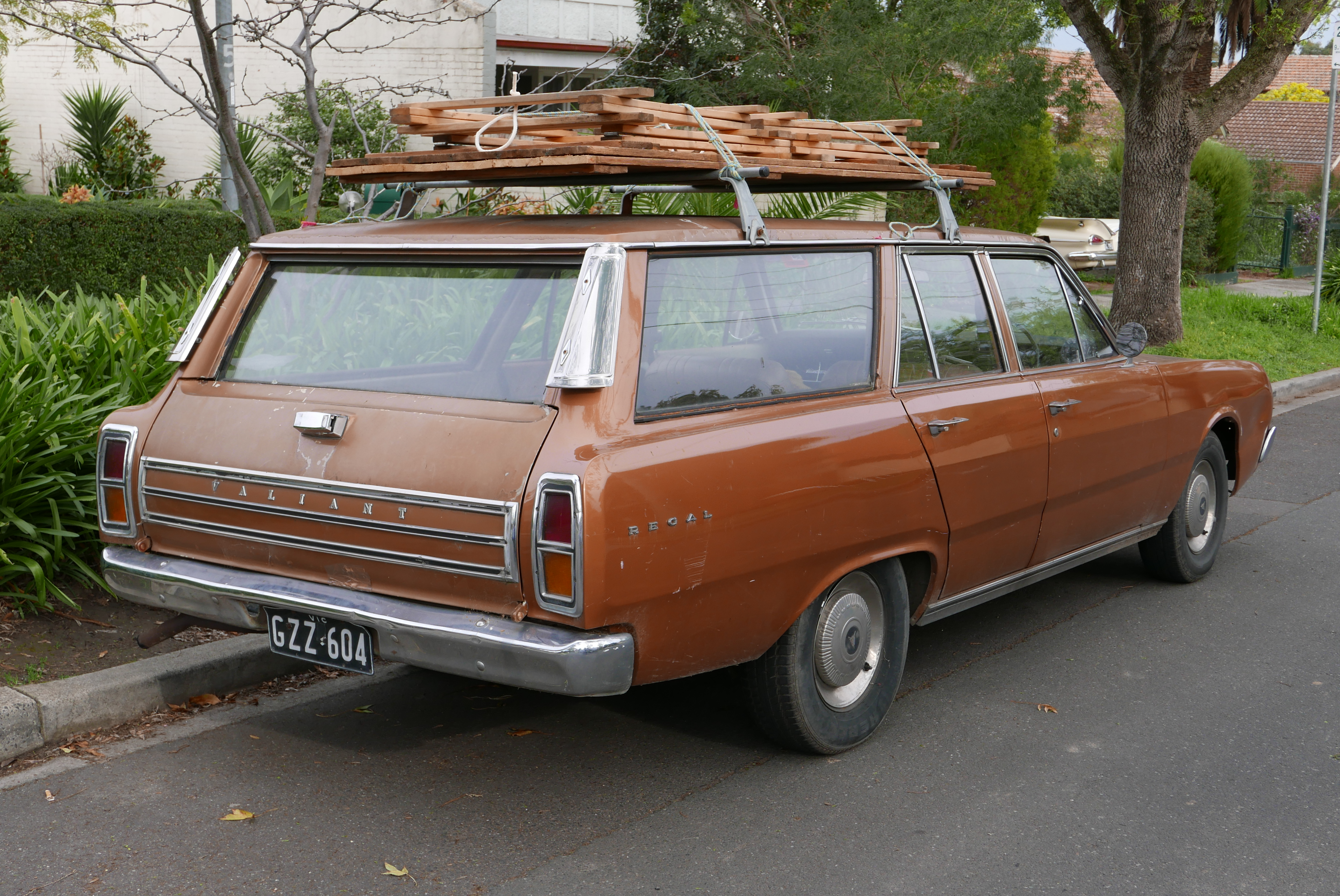
Chrysler VG Valiant Regal Safari wagon

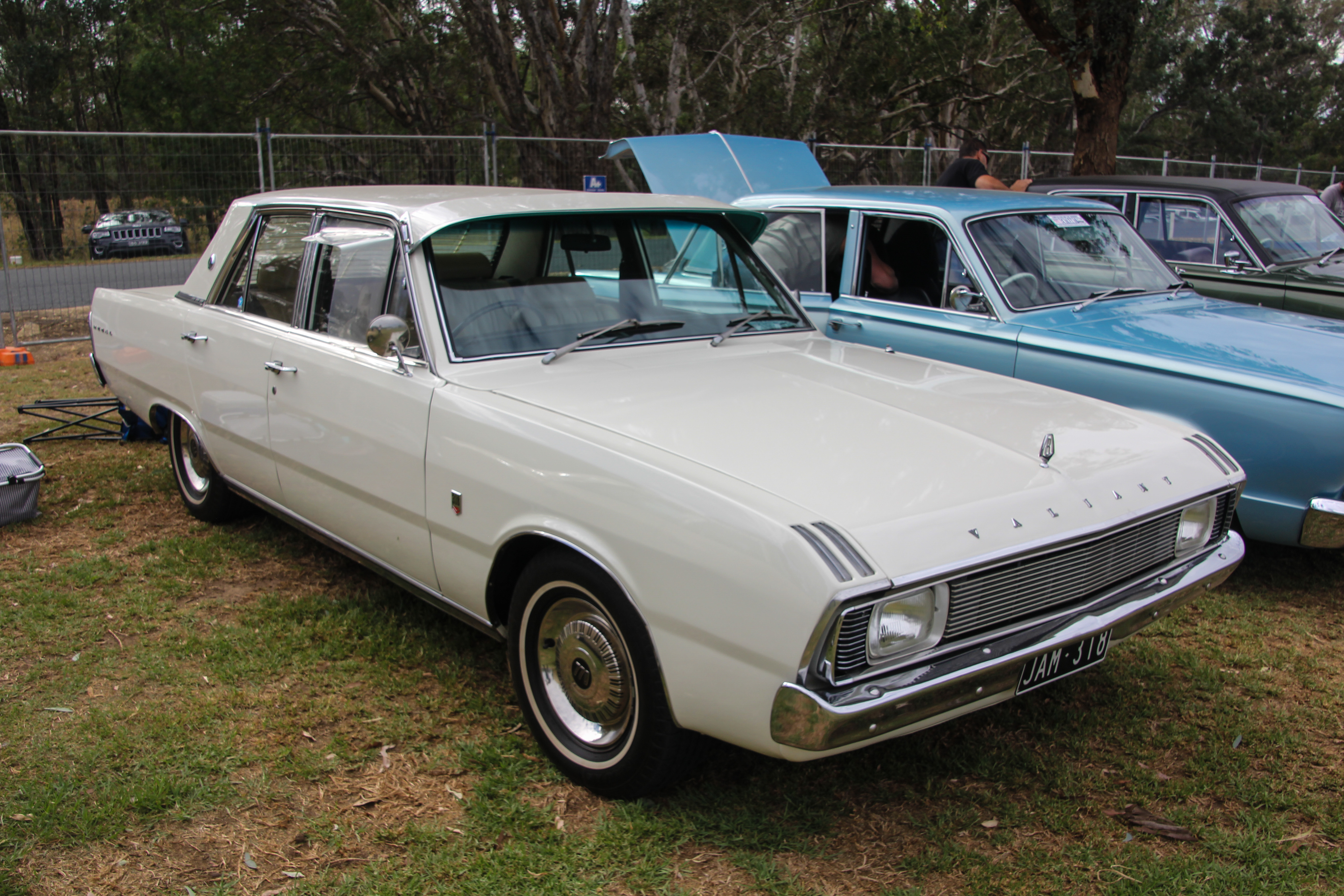
Chrysler VG Valiant Regal 770 sedan

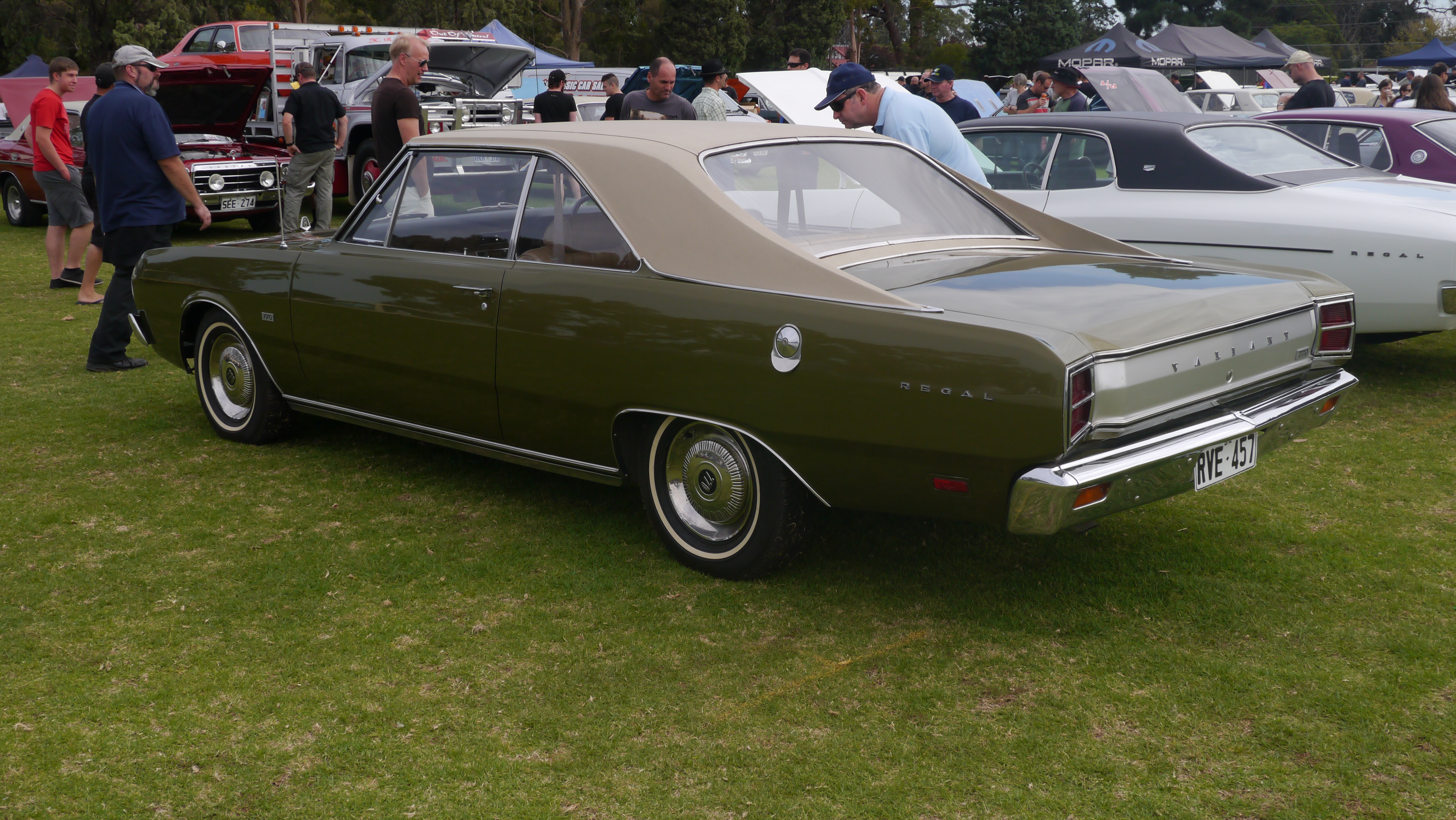
Chrysler VG Valiant Regal 770 hardtop with option A78 roof extension package

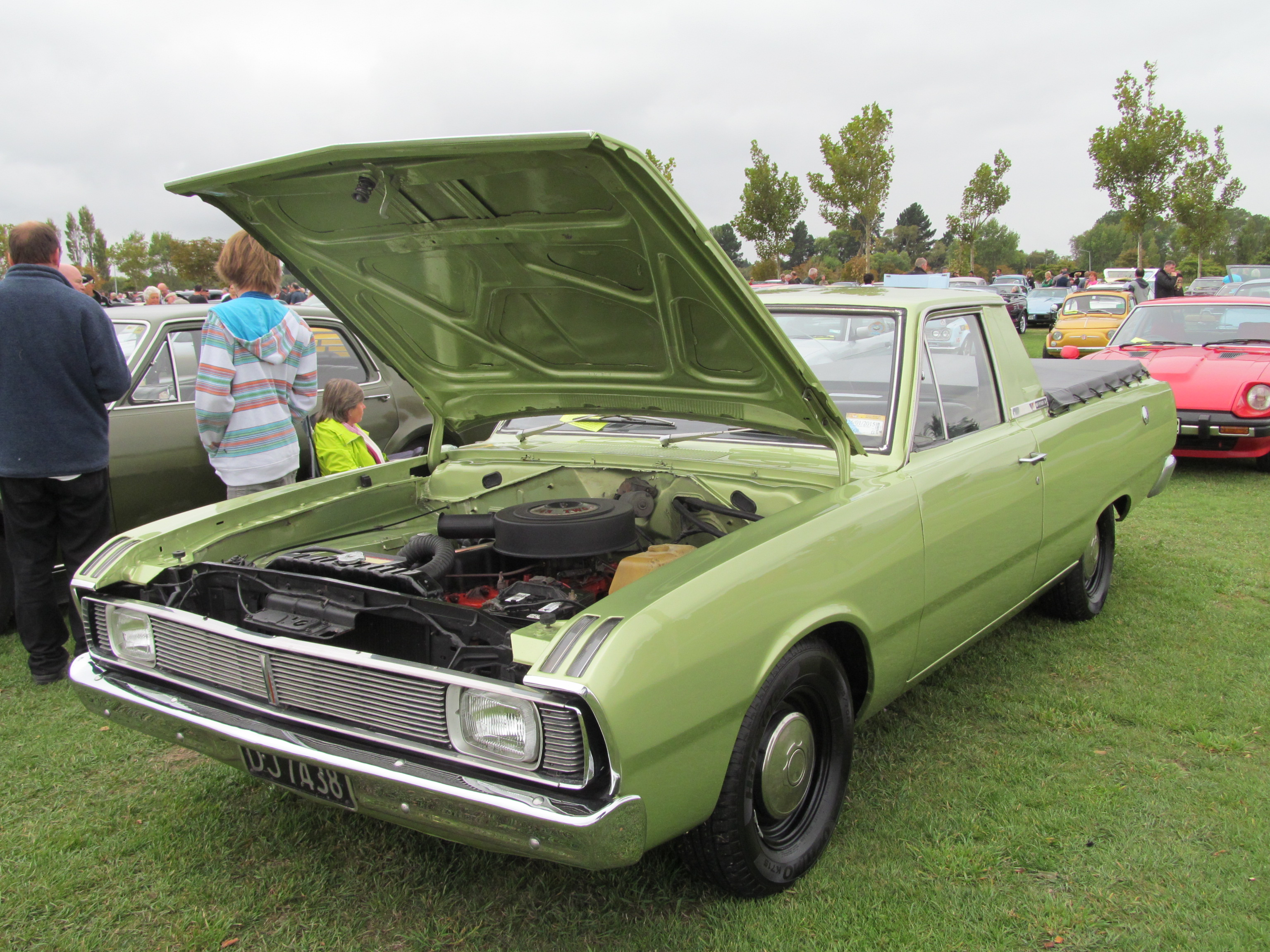
Chrysler VG Valiant Wayfarer utility

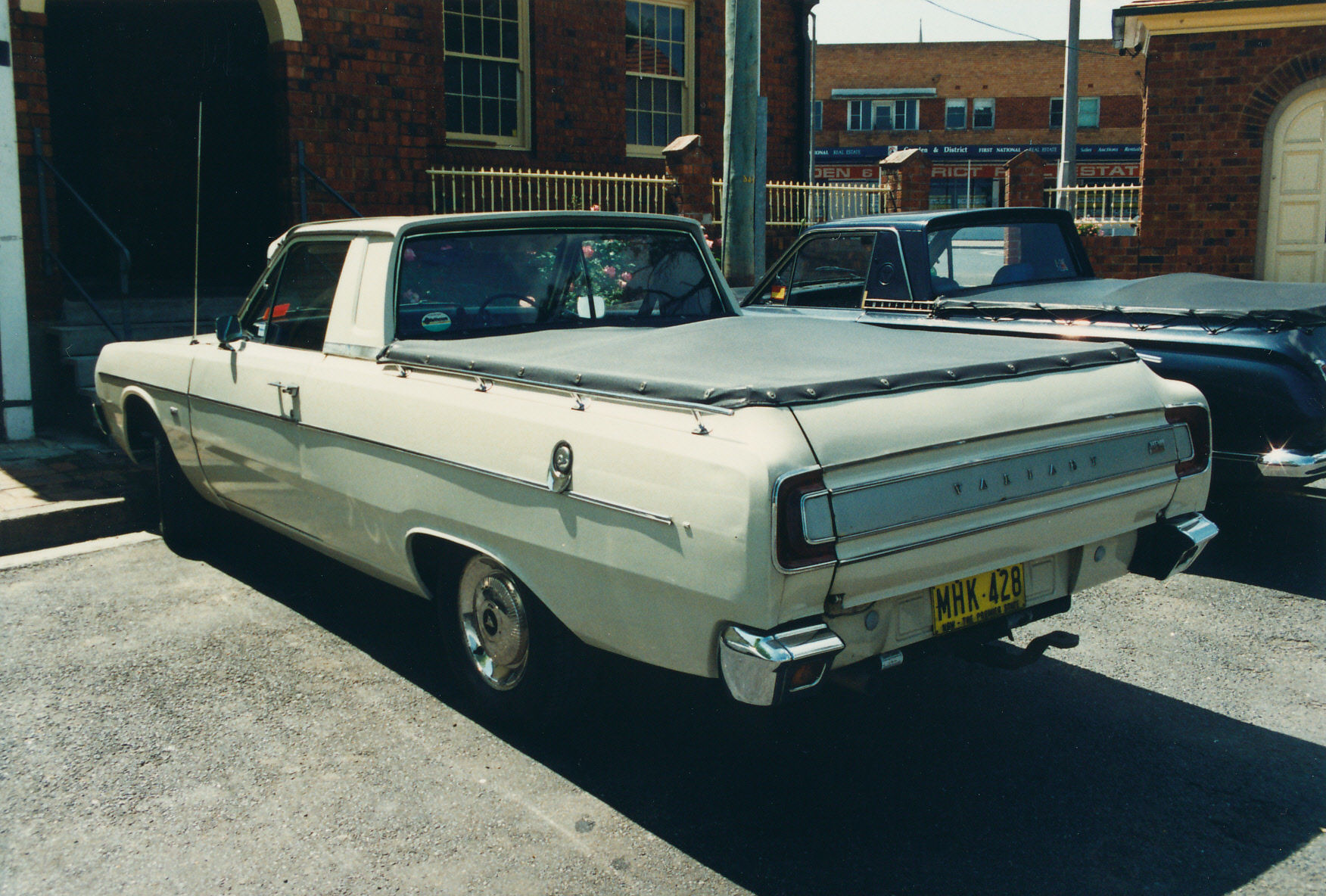
Chrysler VG Valiant Wayfarer utility

=== Dodge utility ===
A heavy duty variant of the utility was marketed as the Dodge utility. (VG-E20)

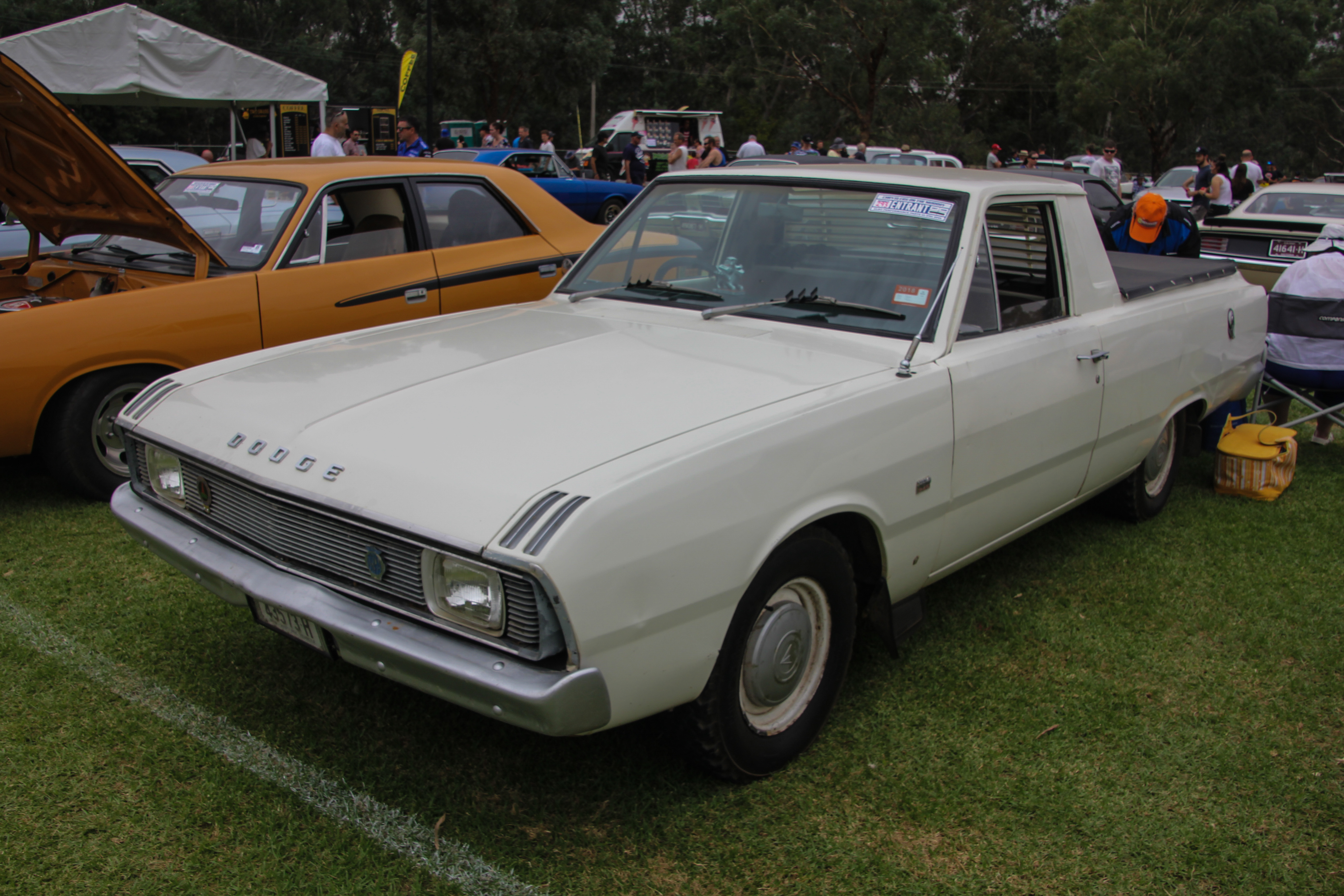
Dodge VG utility

=== Chrysler VIP ===
A long wheelbase variant of the VG Valiant was also offered as the Chrysler VIP (VG-P41).

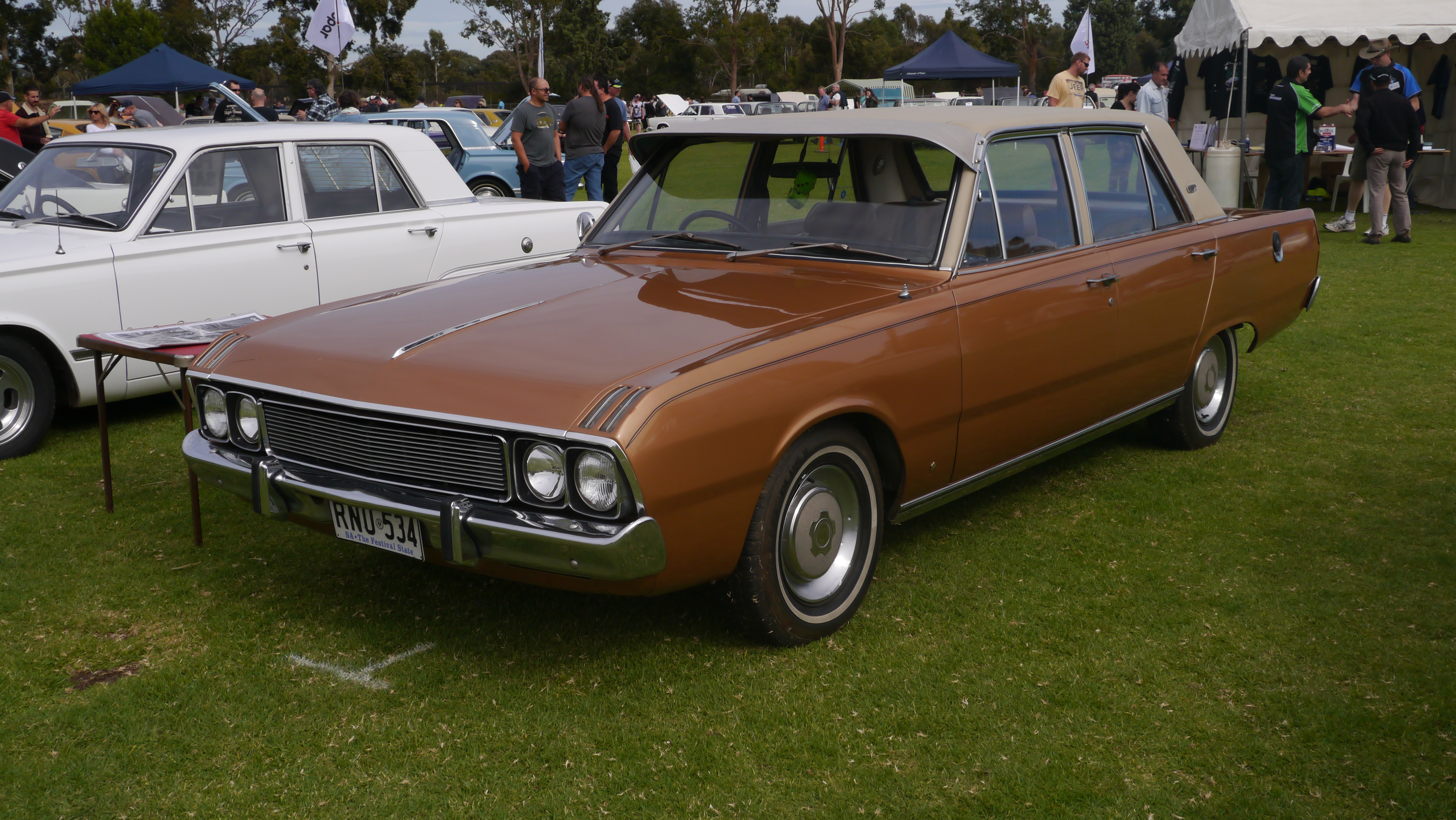
Chrysler VIP

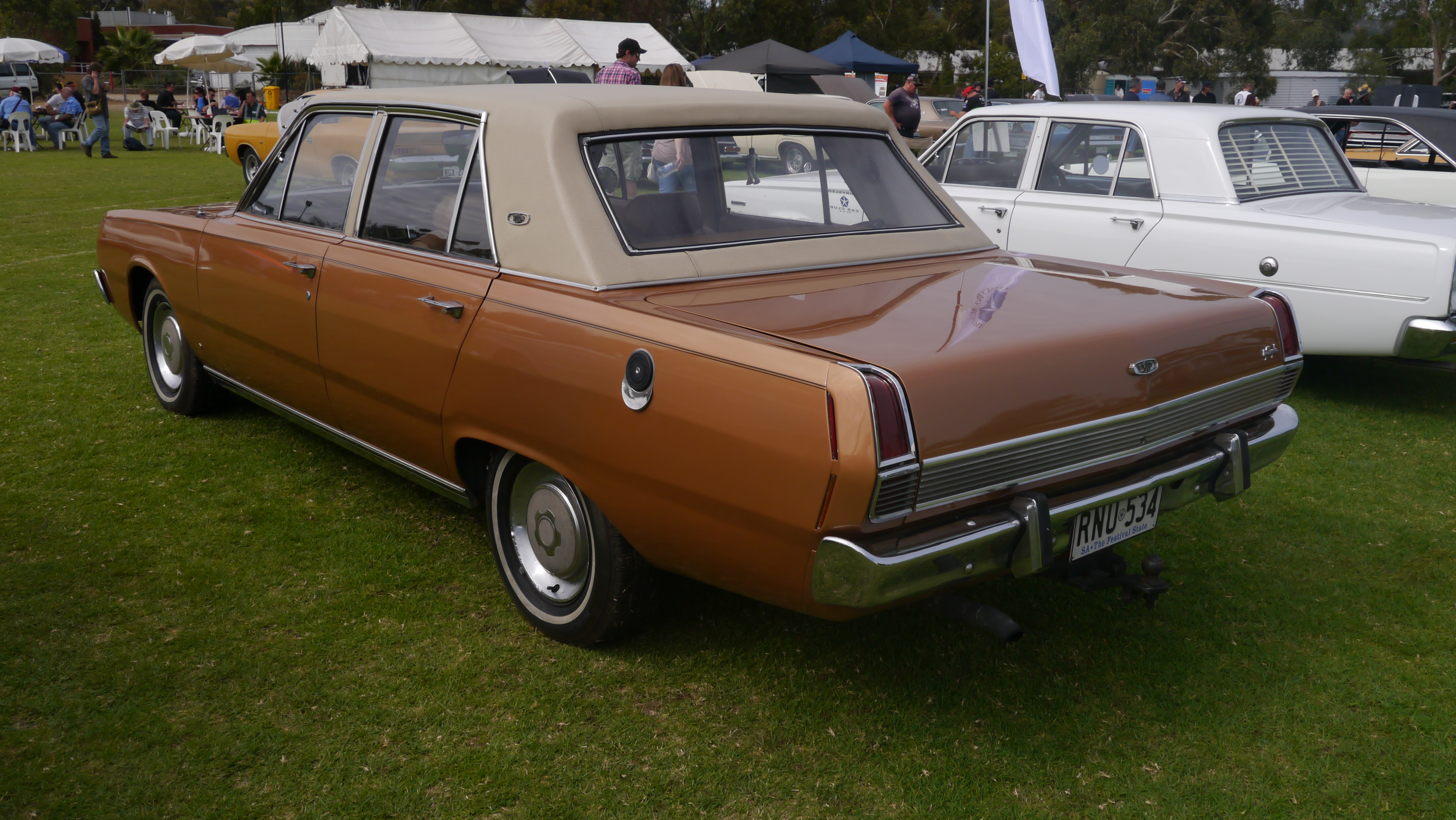
Chrysler VIP

== Engines and transmissions ==
Four engines were offered.

- 225 cu in (3.7 L) I6 "Slant 6"
- 215 cu in (3.5 L) I6 "Hemi"
- 245 cu in (4.0 L) I6 "Hemi"
- 318 cu in (5.2 L) V8

The 215 cu in (3.5 L) "Hemi" was added to the lineup early in 1971, replacing the 225 cu in (3.7 L) "Slant 6".

Two transmissions were available.

- Three speed manual
- Three speed automatic

== Production and replacement ==
A total 52,944 of VG series Valiants were built prior to the replacement of the VG by the Valiant VH in June 1971.
